= 1948 Pacific typhoon season =

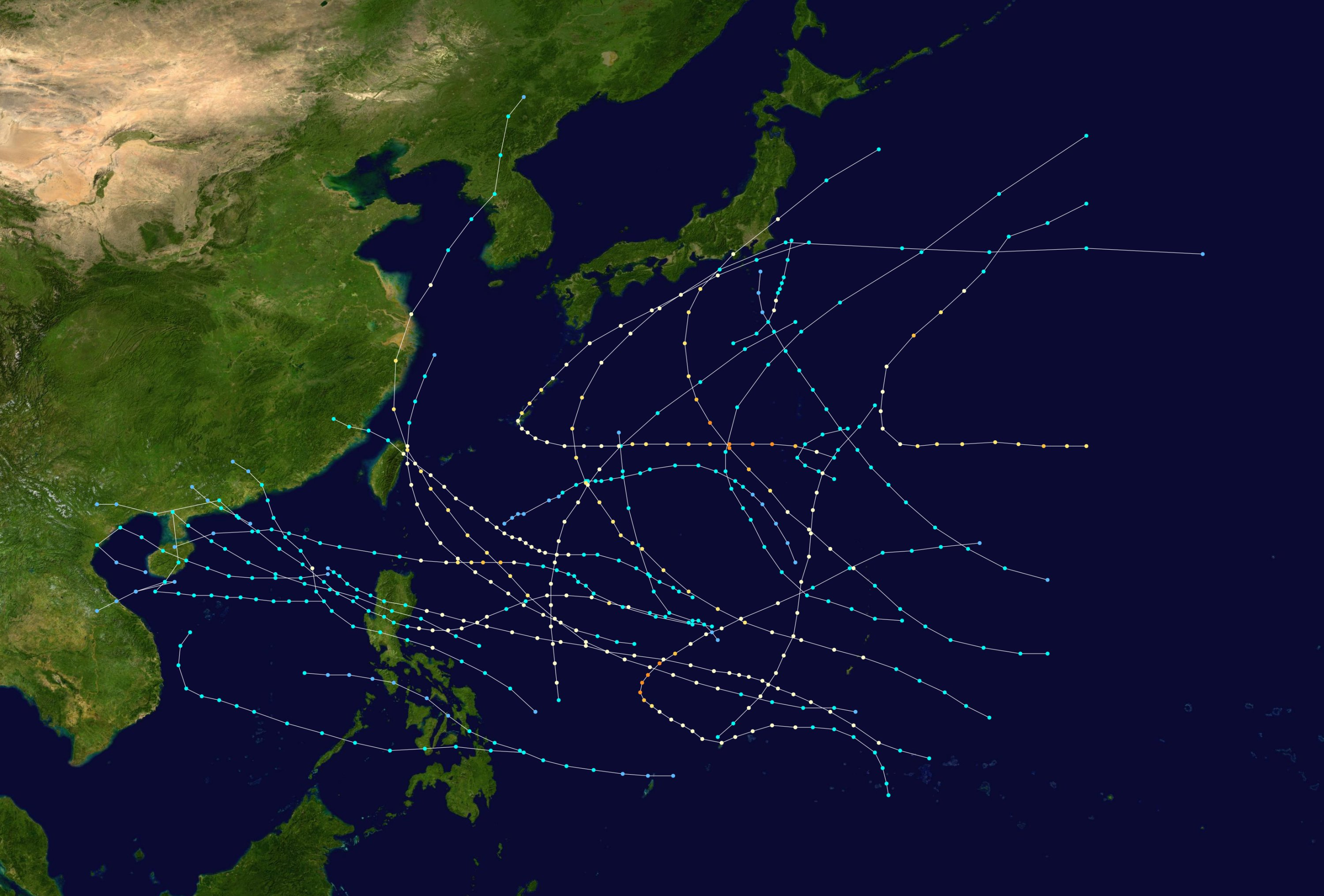
- Season summary map

Seasonal boundaries
- First system formed: January 11, 1948
- Last system dissipated: December 16, 1948

Strongest storm
- Name: Libby
  - Maximum winds: 230 km/h (145 mph) (1-minute sustained)
  - Lowest pressure: 924 hPa (mbar)

Seasonal statistics
- Total storms: 26
- Typhoons: 15
- Total fatalities: Unknown
- Total damage: Unknown

Related articles
- 1948 Atlantic hurricane season; 1942–1948 Pacific hurricane seasons; 1940s North Indian Ocean cyclone seasons

The 1948 Pacific typhoon season was an average season. It had no official bounds; it ran year-round in 1948, but most tropical cyclones tend to form in the northwestern Pacific Ocean between June and December. These dates conventionally delimit the period of each year when most tropical cyclones form in the northwestern Pacific Ocean.

The scope of this article is limited to the Pacific Ocean, north of the equator and west of the International Date Line. Storms that form east of the date line and north of the equator are called hurricanes; see 1948 Pacific hurricane season. At the time, tropical storms that formed within this region of the western Pacific were identified and named by the United States Armed Services, and these names are taken from the list that USAS publicly adopted before the 1945 season started.

== Storms ==
=== Super Typhoon Karen ===
- Typhoon (JMA)
- Category 4 super typhoon (SSHWS)
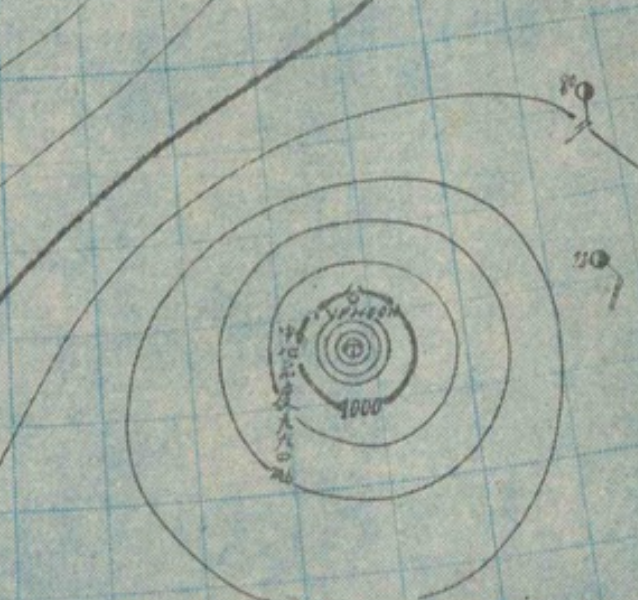
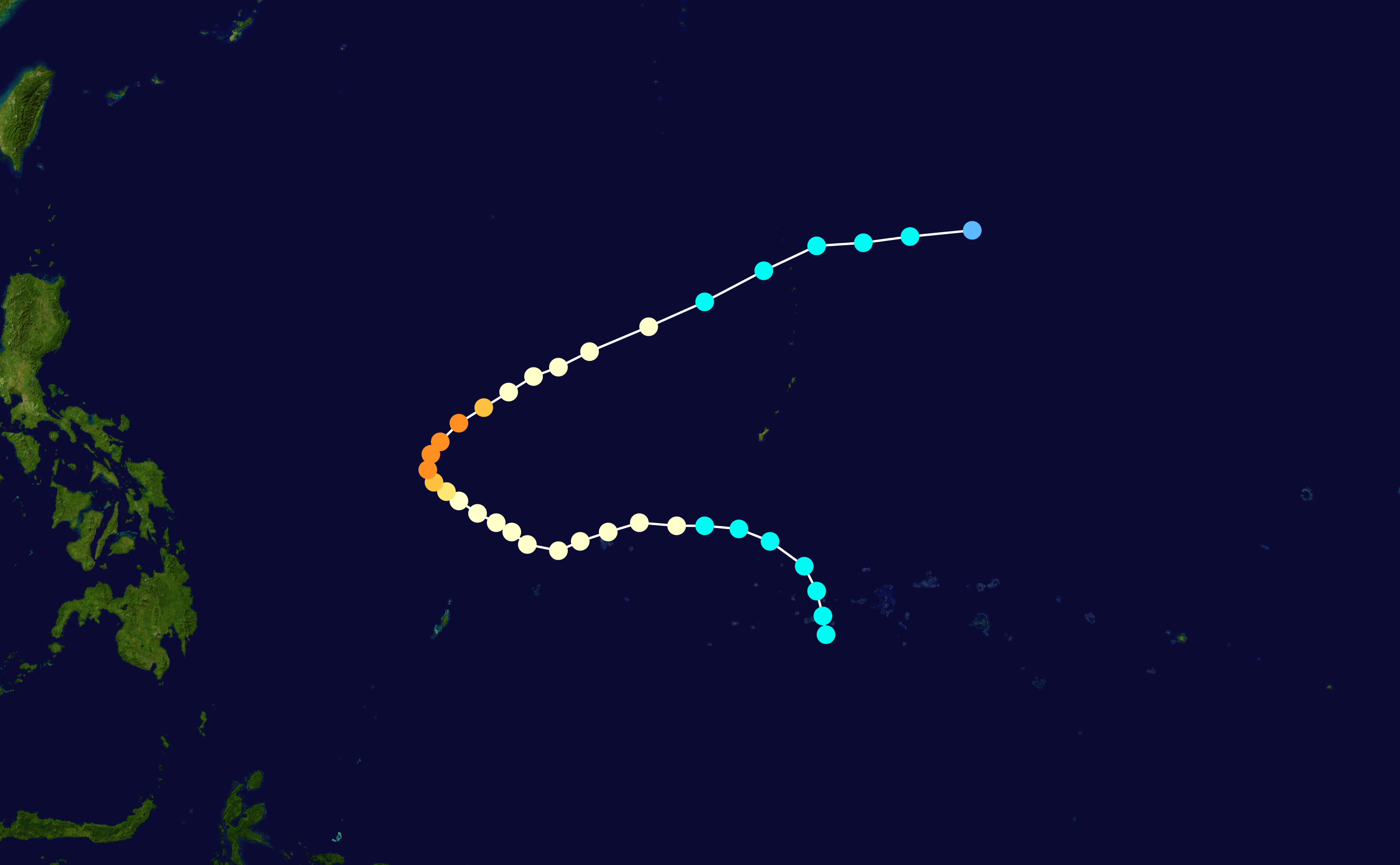
- Duration: January 11 – January 19
- Peak intensity: 240 km/h (150 mph) (1-min); 936 hPa (mbar)

Typhoon Karen, one of the earliest recorded super typhoons, developed on January 11, well west of the Philippines. It curved westward while slowly intensifying. After a prolonged period of slow intensification, the tropical cyclone began to rapidly strengthen. It became a super typhoon on January 16. Shortly after, it weakened and dissipated on January 19.

It struck Yap on January 14, damaging and destroying establishments and houses on the island. It also wrecked the roofs of some U.S. warehouses and buildings, and downed power lines. A food warehouse were washed out; however, some food supplies survived.

After the typhoon, the navy transported some relief supplies to the populated island. No deaths were reported.

=== Typhoon Lana ===
- Typhoon (JMA)
- Category 1 typhoon (SSHWS)
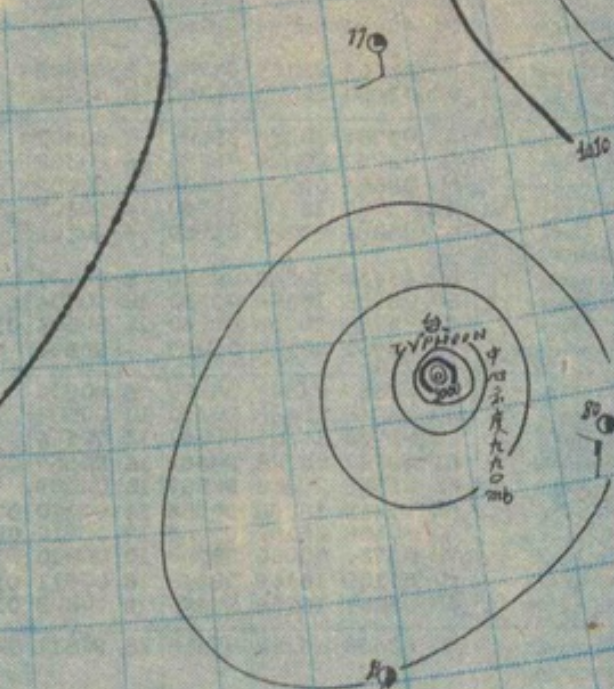
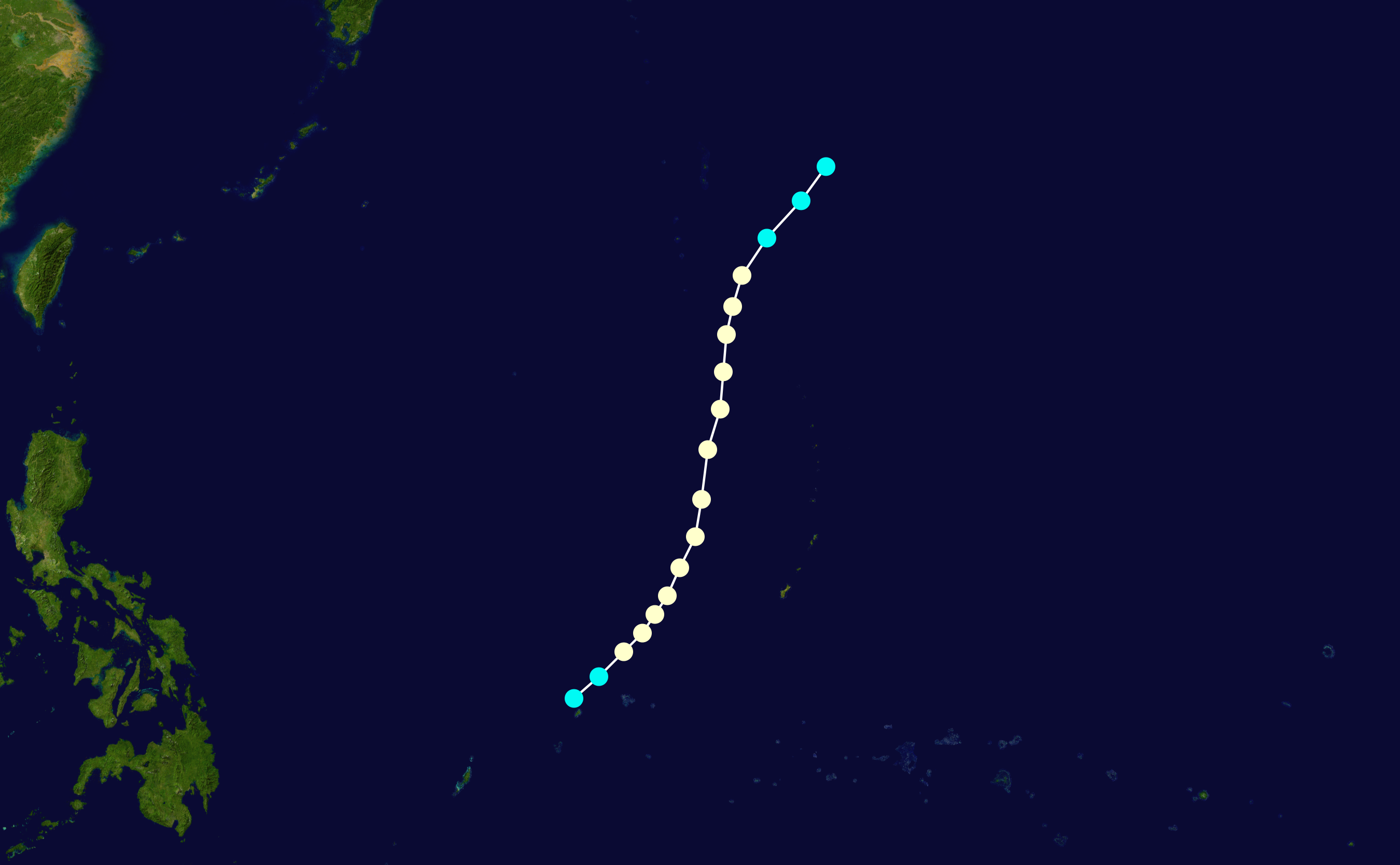
- Duration: May 16 – May 20
- Peak intensity: 150 km/h (90 mph) (1-min); 971 hPa (mbar)

Typhoon Lana, the second system of the season, formed on May 16, west of the Philippines. It moved to the north-northeast while intensifying, reaching its peak intensity somewhere on May 18 and 19. It then weakened, until it was last noted on May 20 as it merged with a cold front.

Warnings were issued for Yap, Palau, Guam and Ulithi in preparations for the storm. All ships in these islands were instructed to escape to Sangley Point due to the approaching typhoon.

A plane in Guam encountered the strength of the typhoon; however, it escaped its fury. Eighteen individuals were reported dead in Yap when their canoe sank during the storm. The damage, however, was minimal.

=== Typhoon Mabel ===
- Typhoon (JMA)
- Category 1 typhoon (SSHWS)
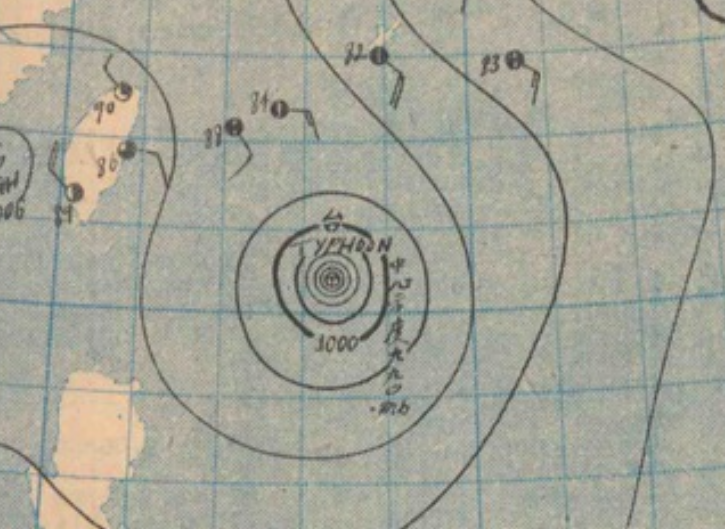
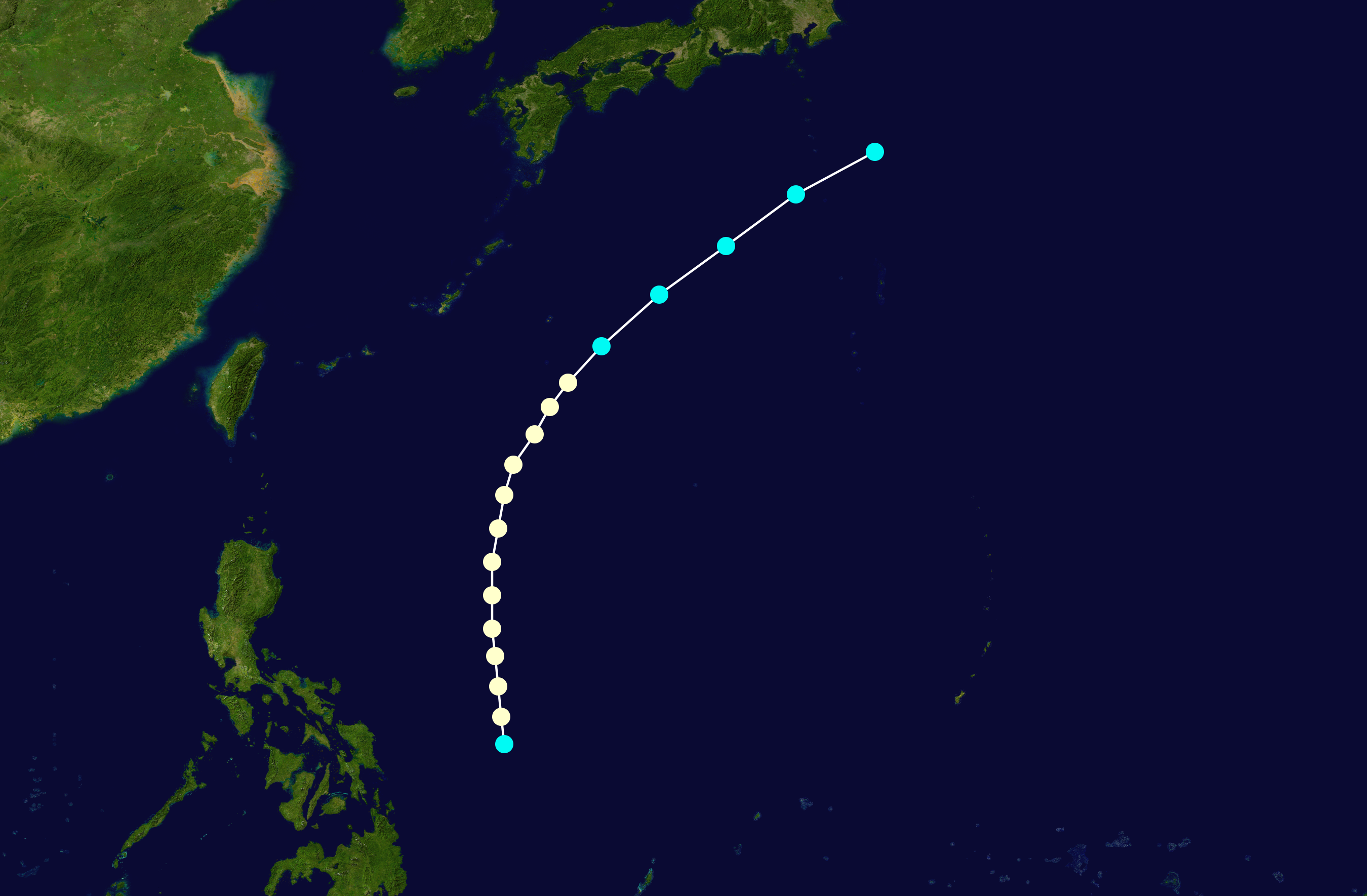
- Duration: May 29 – June 2
- Peak intensity: 150 km/h (90 mph) (1-min); 964 hPa (mbar)

Mabel formed east of the Philippines as a tropical storm. It moved north-northeast and quickly strengthened into a Category 1 typhoon.

=== Tropical Storm Nadine ===
- Typhoon (JMA)
- Tropical storm (SSHWS)
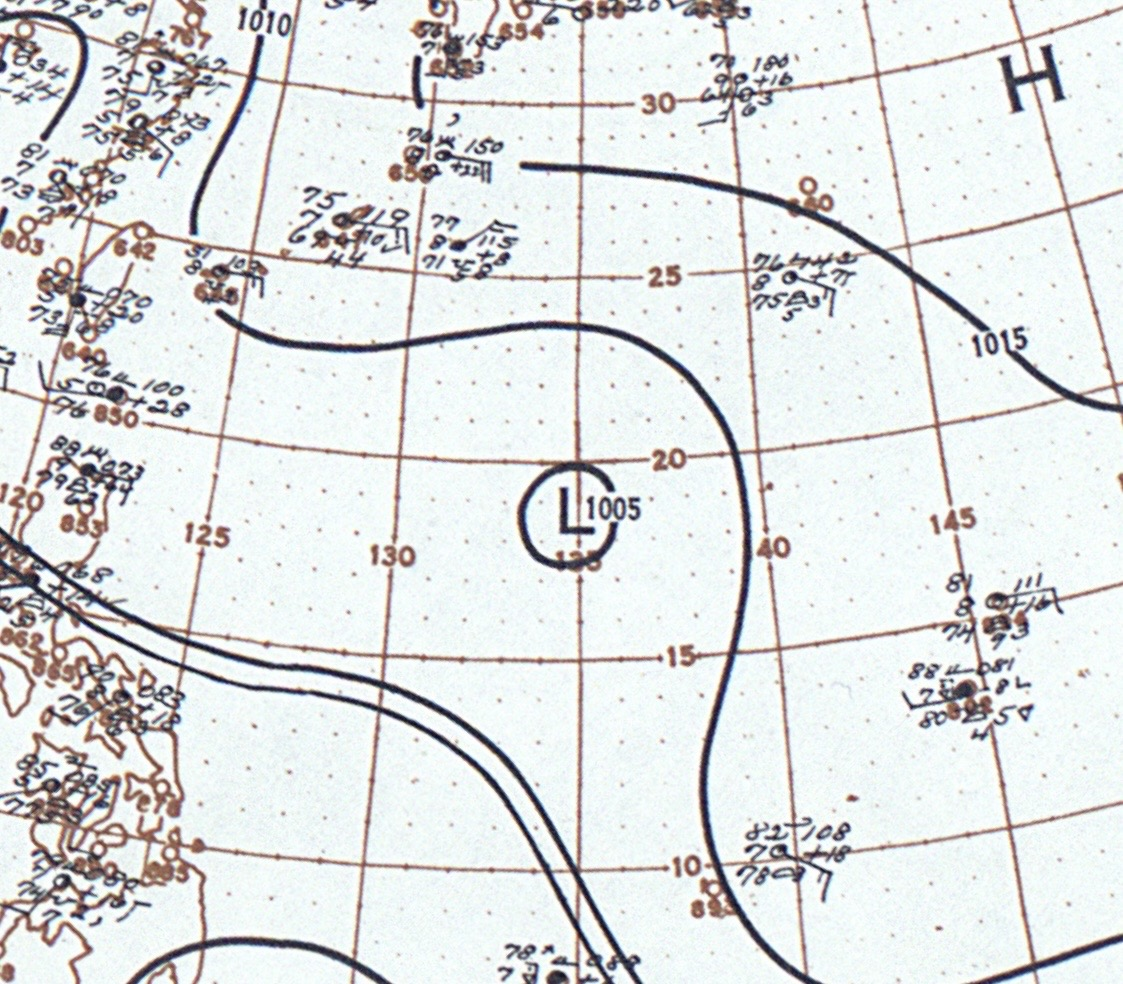
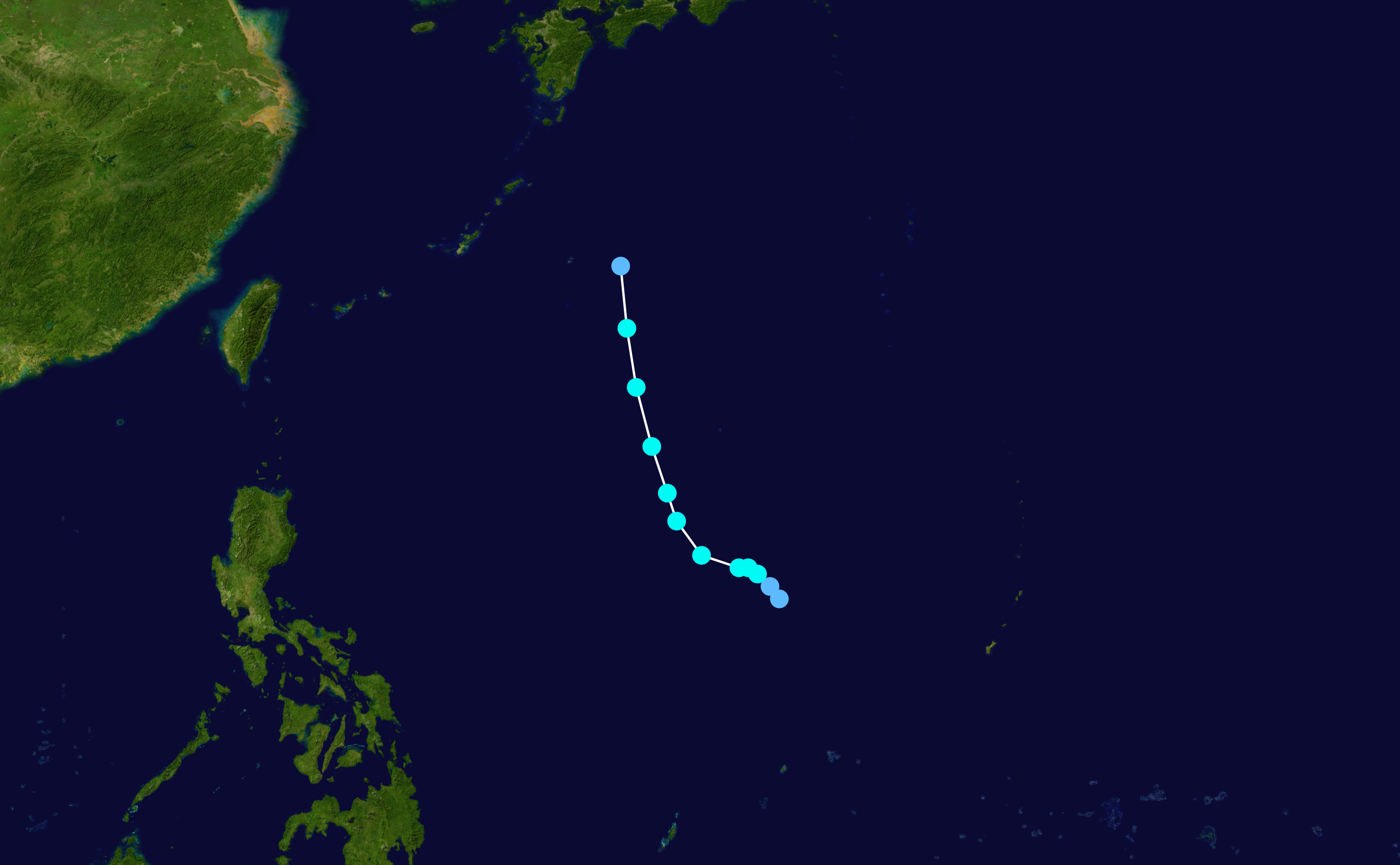
- Duration: June 9 – June 11
- Peak intensity: 110 km/h (70 mph) (1-min); 986 hPa (mbar)

Nadine formed on June 9 east of the Philippines. It traveled north and weakened into a tropical depression before dissipating on June 11.

=== Tropical Storm Ophelia ===
- Tropical storm (SSHWS)
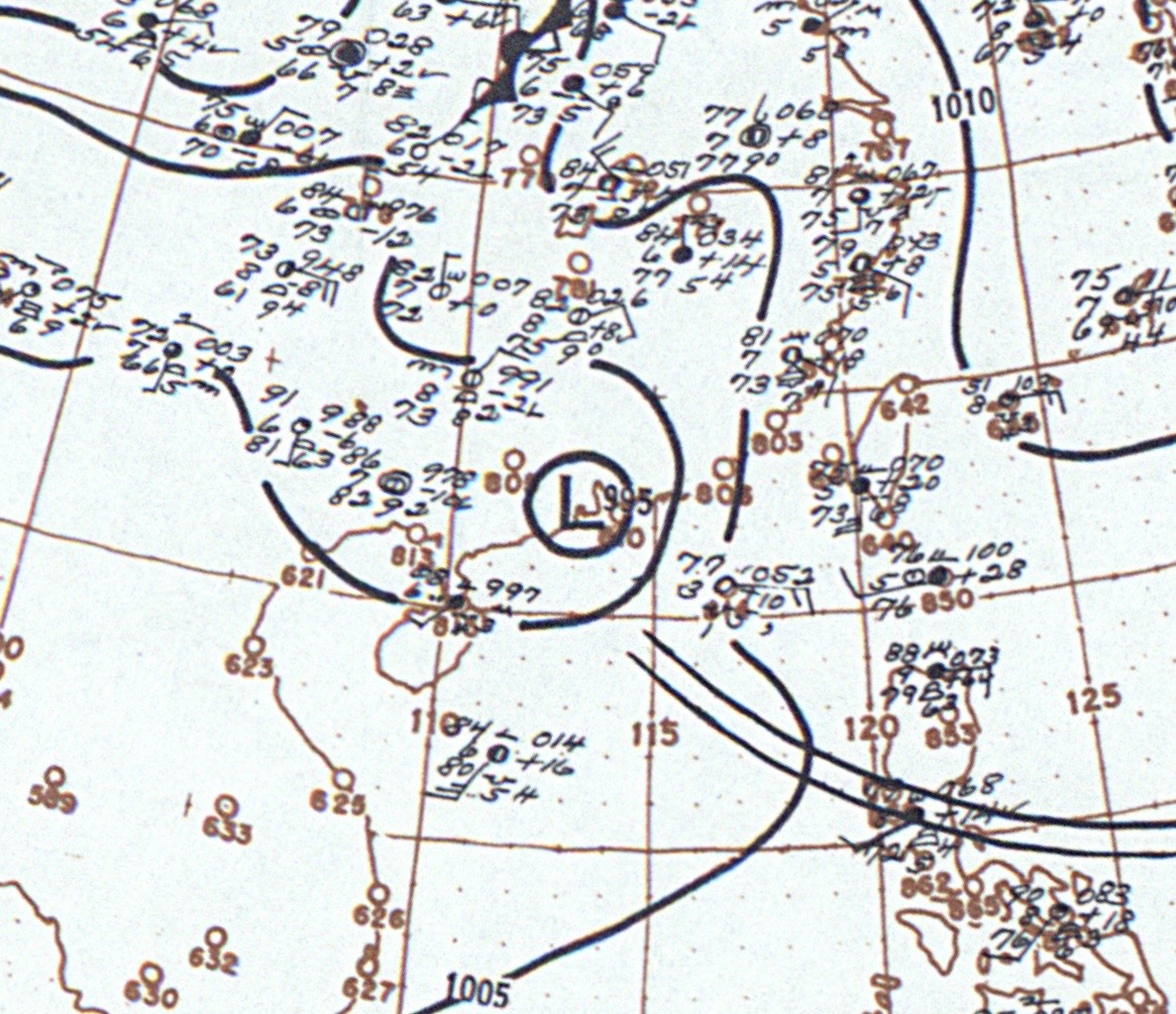
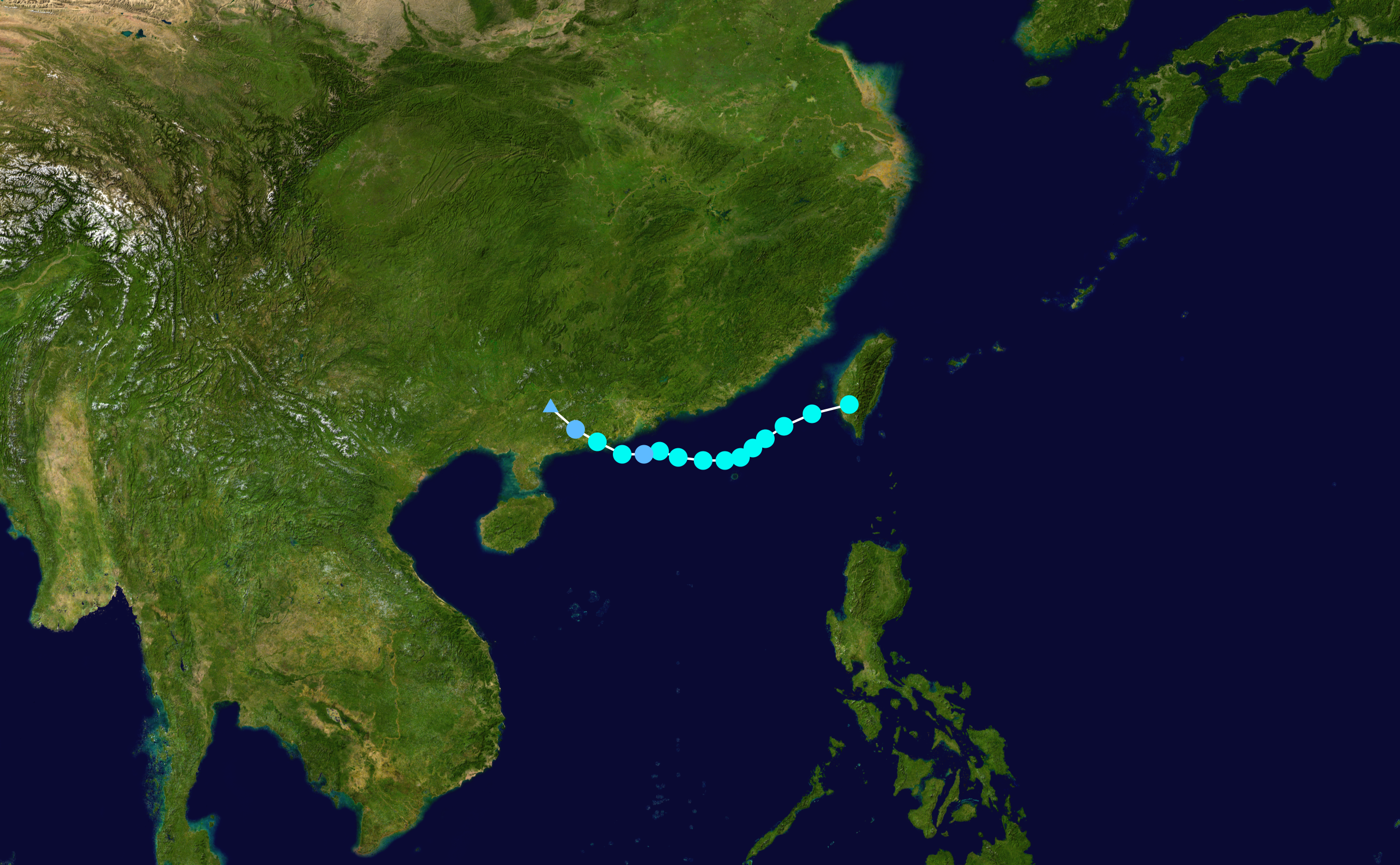
- Duration: June 10 – June 11
- Peak intensity: 75 km/h (45 mph) (1-min); 991 hPa (mbar)

Ophelia formed on June 10 in the South China Sea. It moved west and struck southern China. It dissipated the next day, without attaining maximum sustained winds any higher than 45 miles per hour (72 km/h).

=== Typhoon Pearl ===
- Typhoon (JMA)
- Category 2 typhoon (SSHWS)
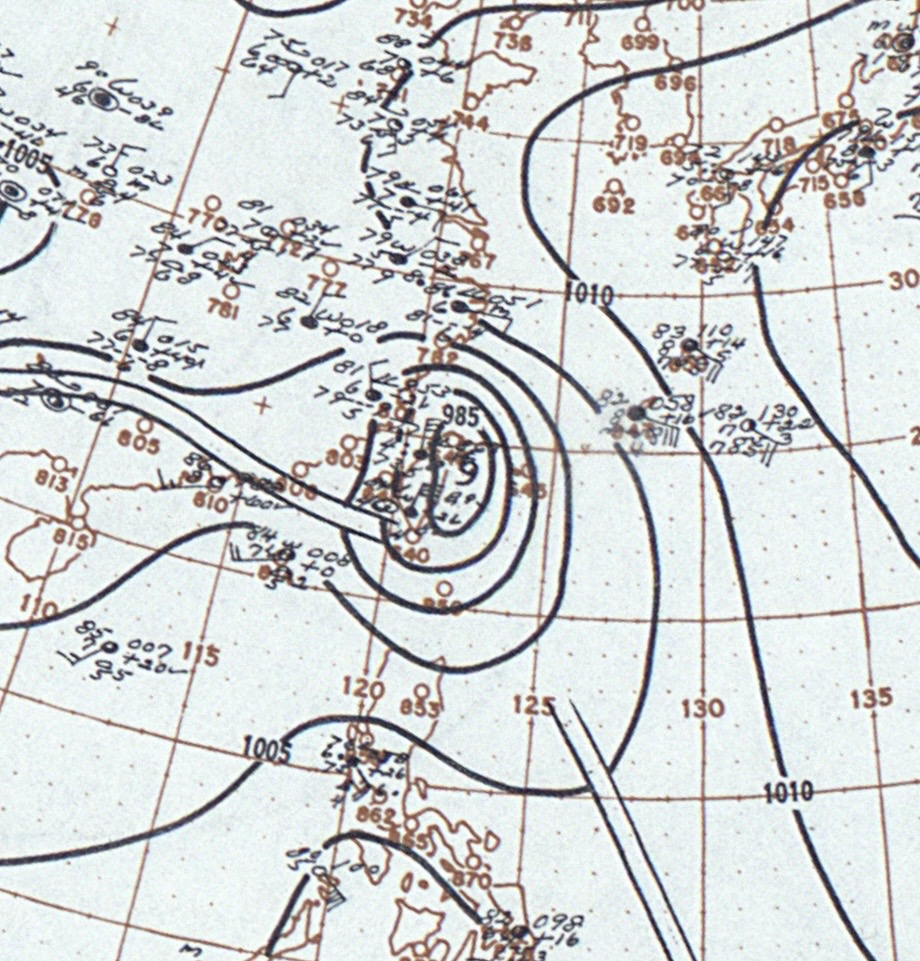
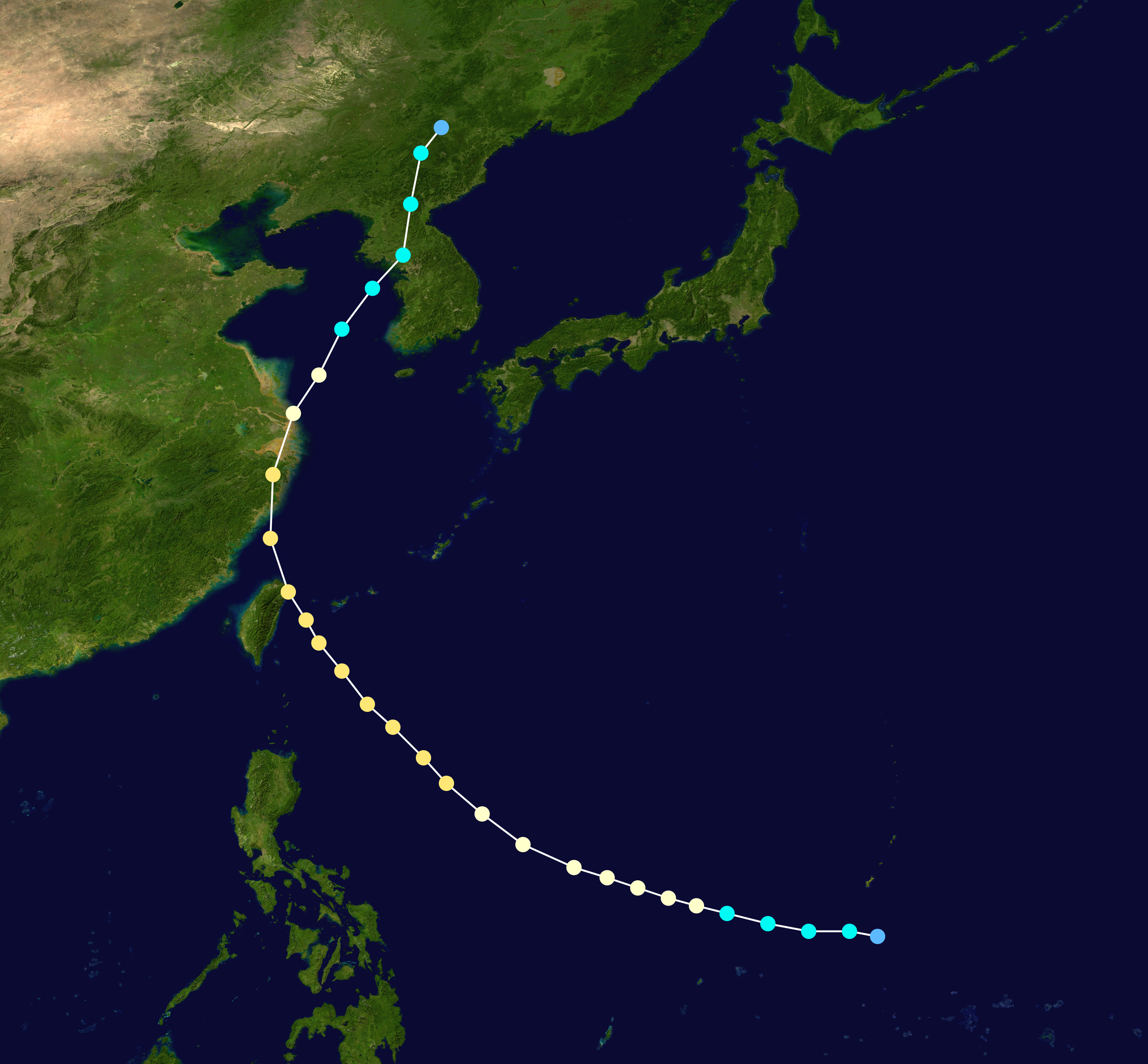
- Duration: July 1 – July 8
- Peak intensity: 165 km/h (105 mph) (1-min); 960 hPa (mbar)

Pearl originated from a tropical depression located south of the Northern Mariana Islands on July 1. Developing into a tropical storm several hours later, further development occurred as Pearl tracked northwards, with it becoming a typhoon the next day. As a result, on July 4, Pearl peaked as a modern-day very strong typhoon with sustained winds of 90 knots (105 mph) Several days later, on July 6, Pearl made landfall 40 miles east of Shanghai, veering to the northwest. Weakening occurred after this landfall, and by the time Pearl struck what is now South Korea, it was a minimal tropical storm. A weakening Pearl tracked northwards before dissipating in Manchuria on July 8.

As Pearl neared Shanghai, American officials took measures to safeguard their vessels in the harbor. Once Pearl struck near the city, dozens were injured due to the typhoon's high winds. Despite not experiencing the typhoon's peak winds, suburbs in Shanghai still saw some damage due to receiving winds up to 70 knots (80 mph). Elsewhere, surge produced by Pearl killed ten people (one of them a missionary) when their boat, which was off the coast of Luzon, capsized.

=== Typhoon Rose ===
- Typhoon (JMA)
- Category 1 typhoon (SSHWS)
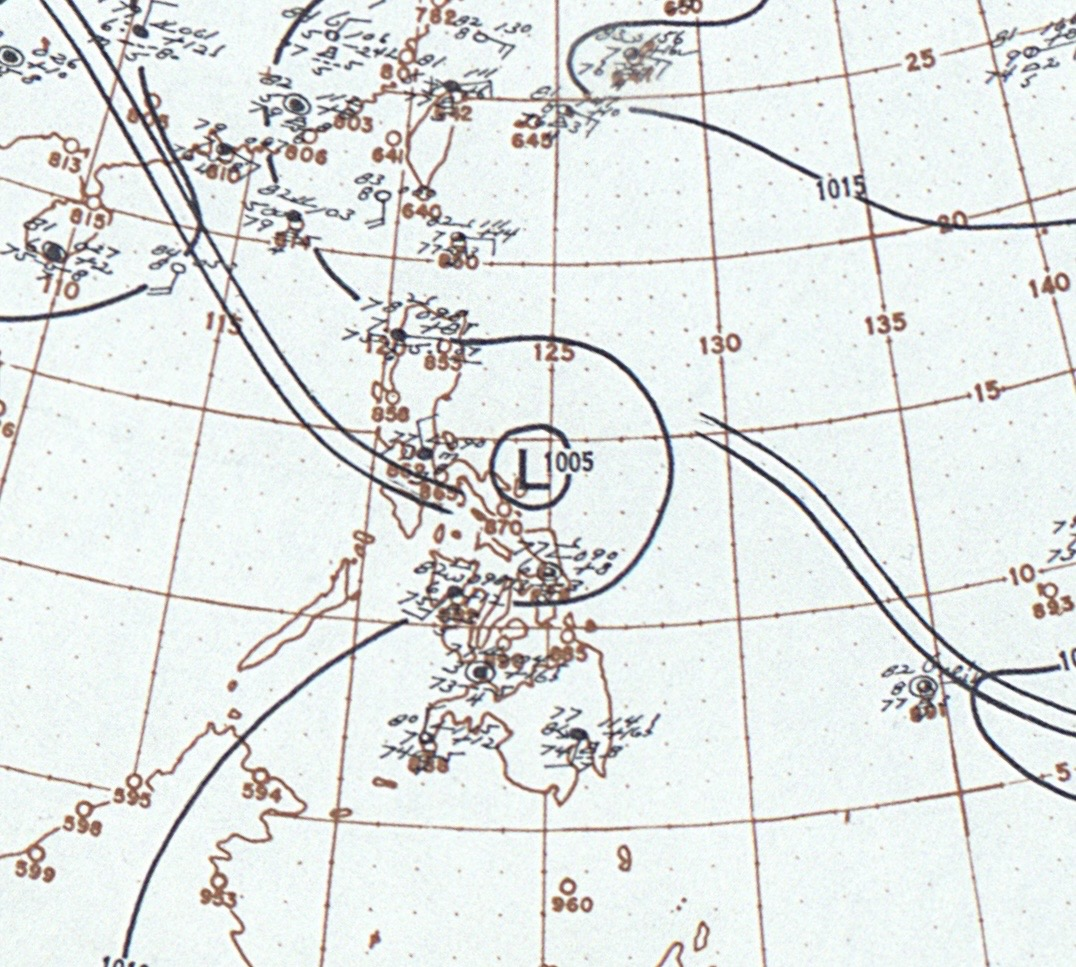
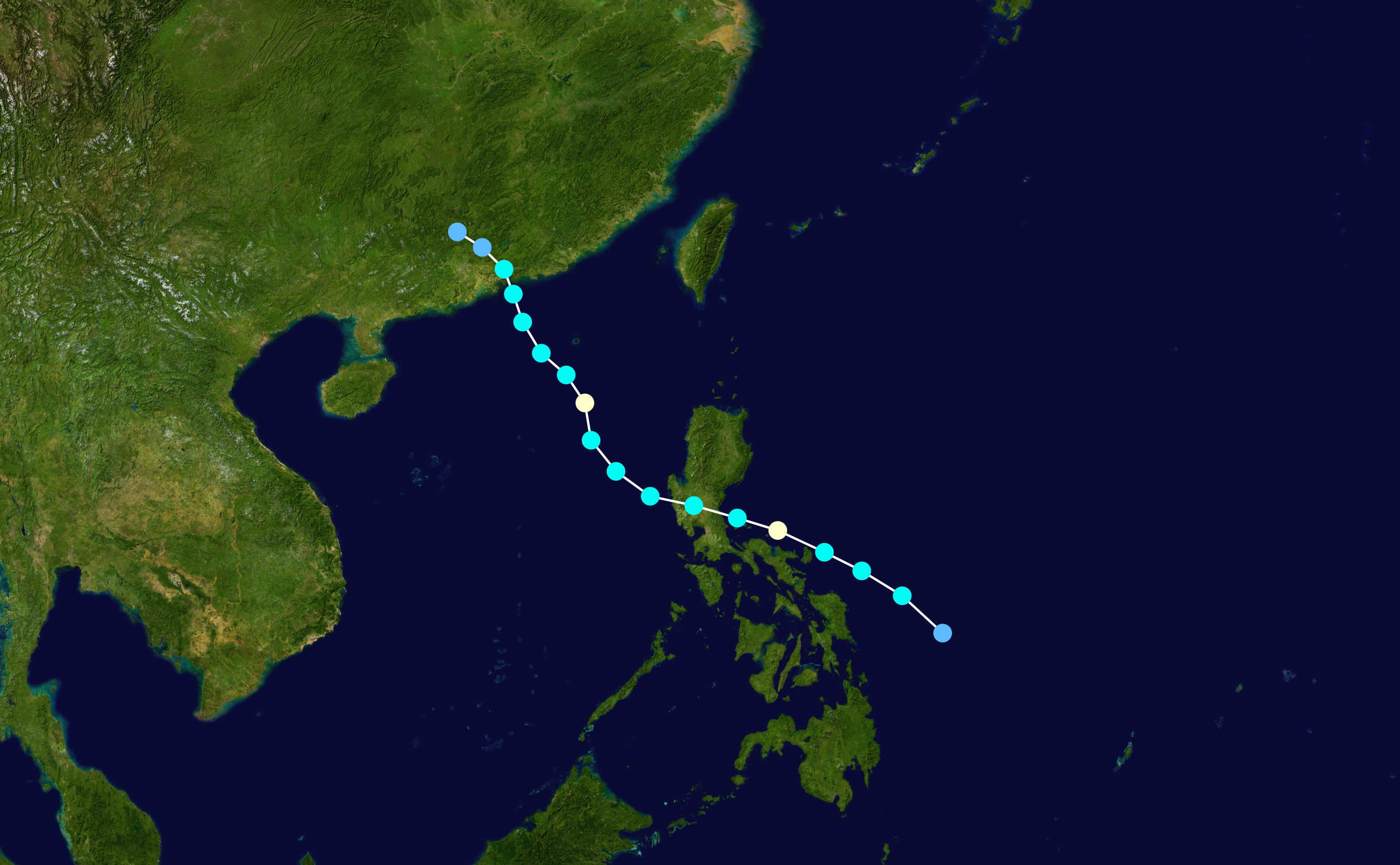
- Duration: July 23 – July 28
- Peak intensity: 130 km/h (80 mph) (1-min); 981 hPa (mbar)

Rose formed east of the Philippines on July 23. It strengthened into a Category 1 typhoon and made landfall in Luzon. The storm traveled north and hit China as a tropical storm, and later dissipated on July 28.

=== Typhoon Bertha ===
- Typhoon (JMA)
- Category 1 typhoon (SSHWS)
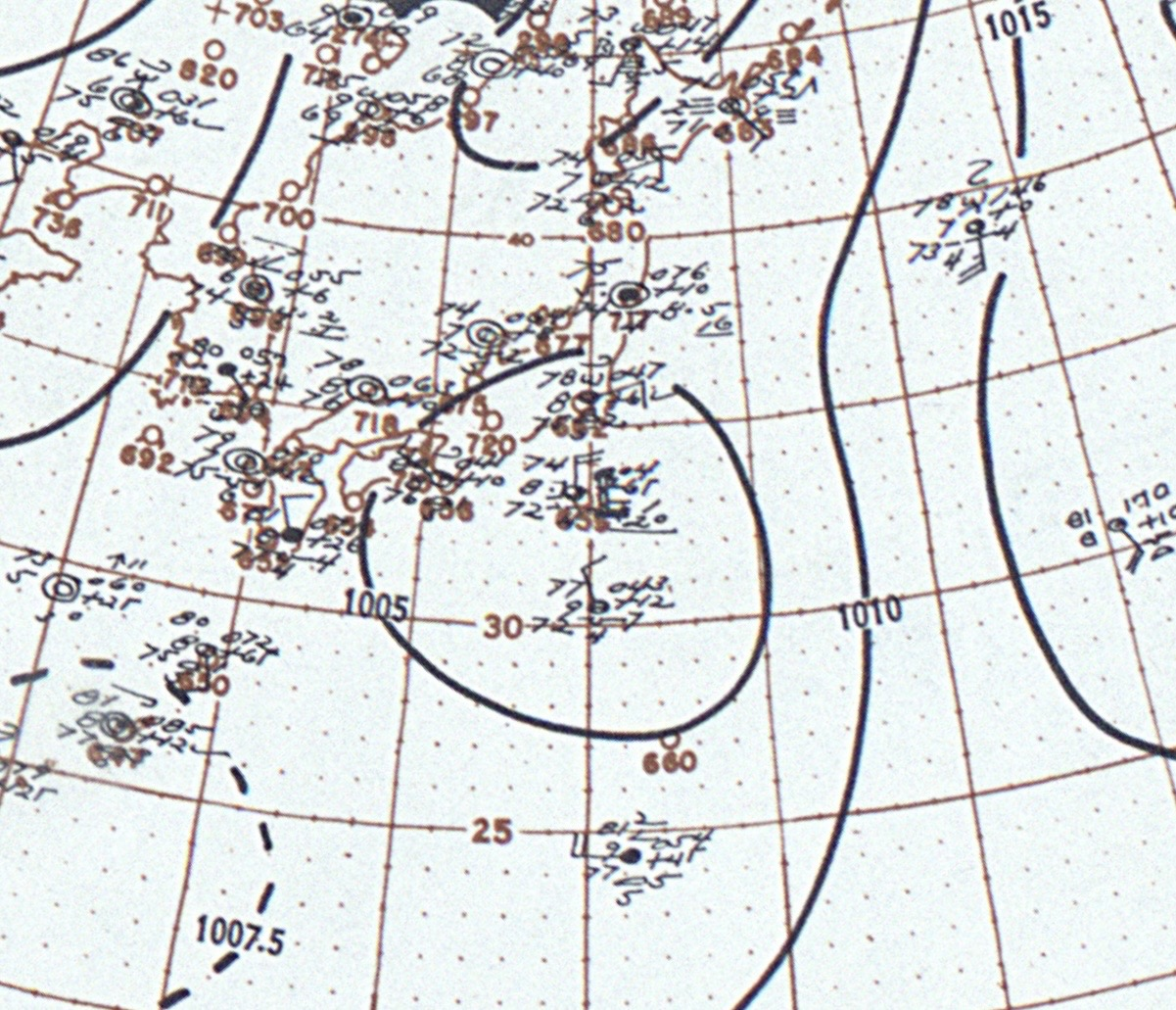
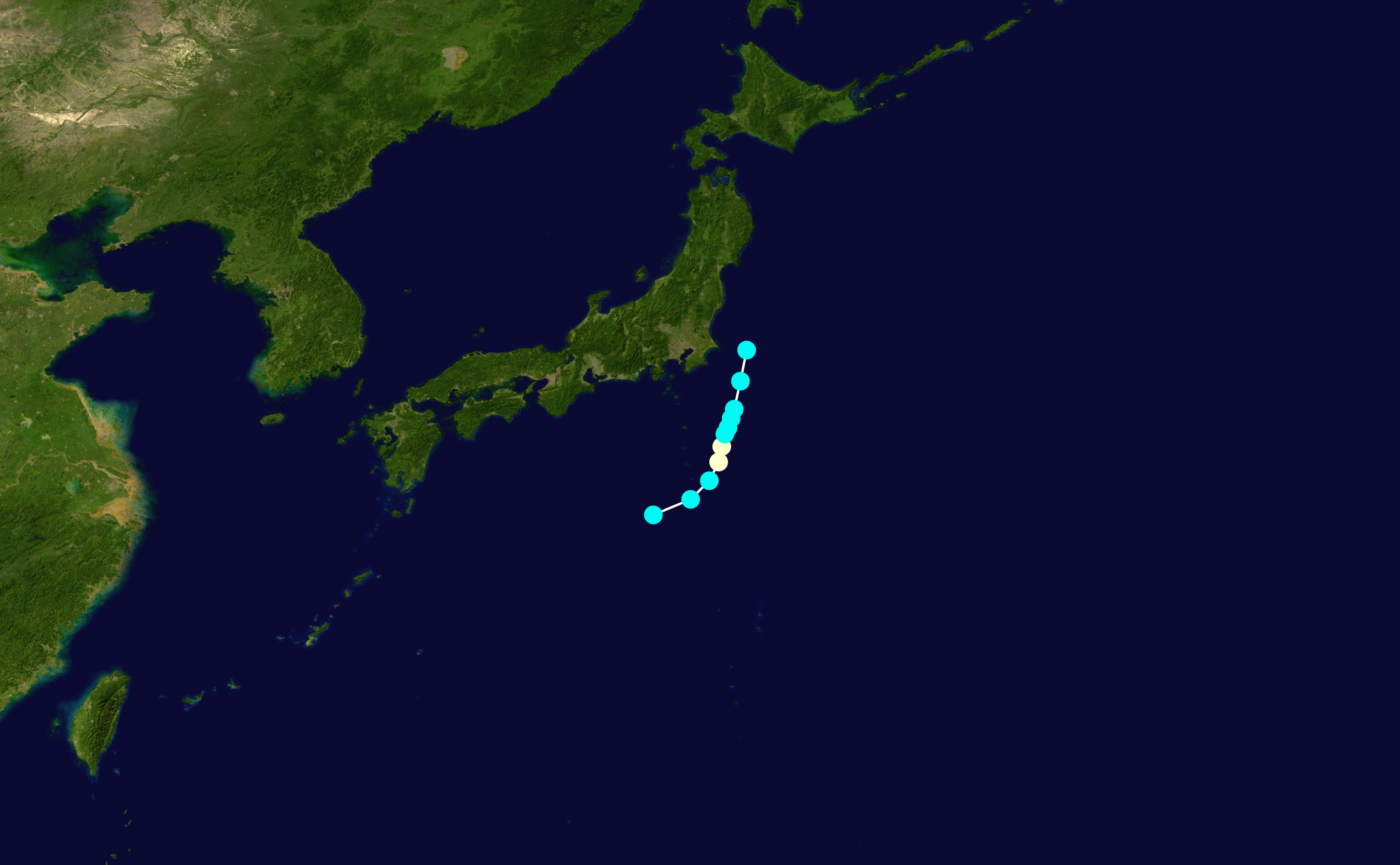
- Duration: August 4 – August 6
- Peak intensity: 130 km/h (80 mph) (1-min); 976 hPa (mbar)

Bertha was a Category 1 typhoon. It formed south of Japan on August 4.

=== Tropical Storm Chris ===
- Tropical storm (SSHWS)
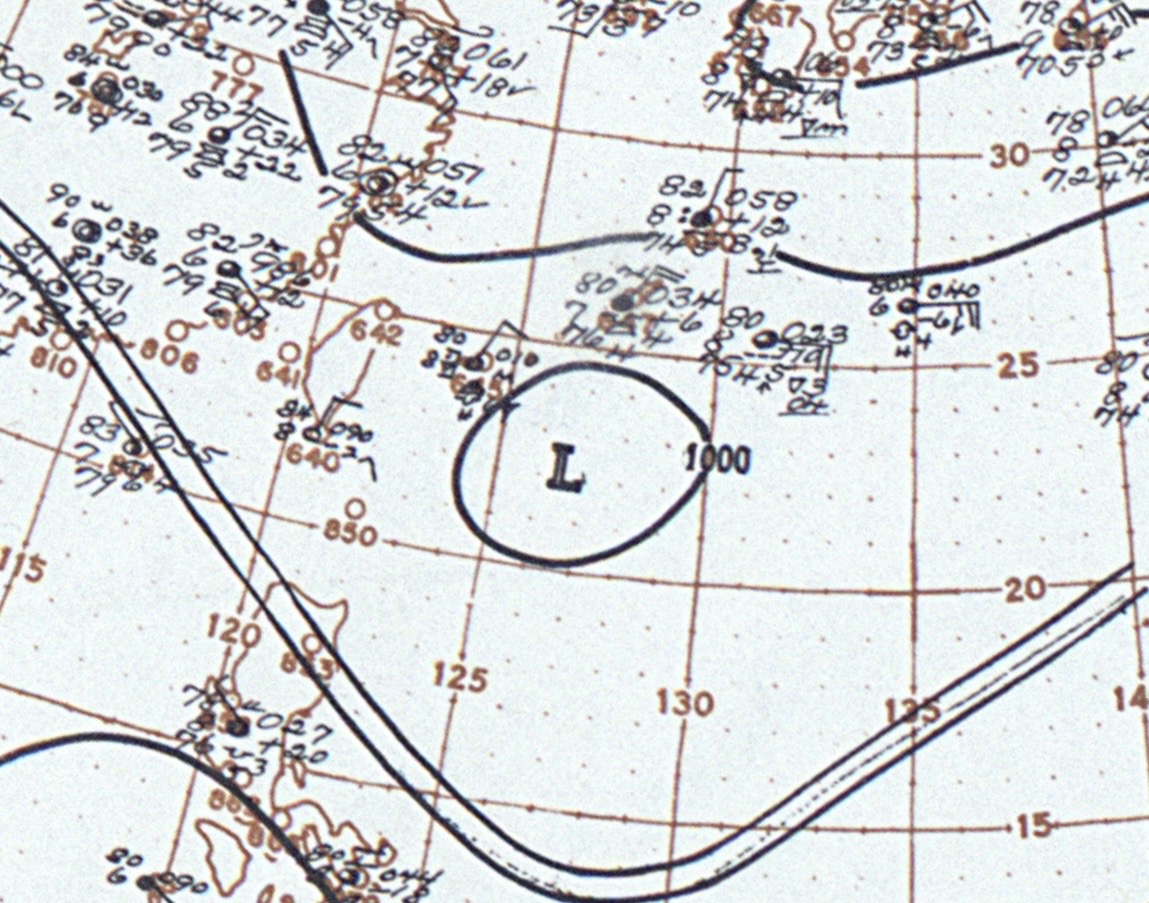
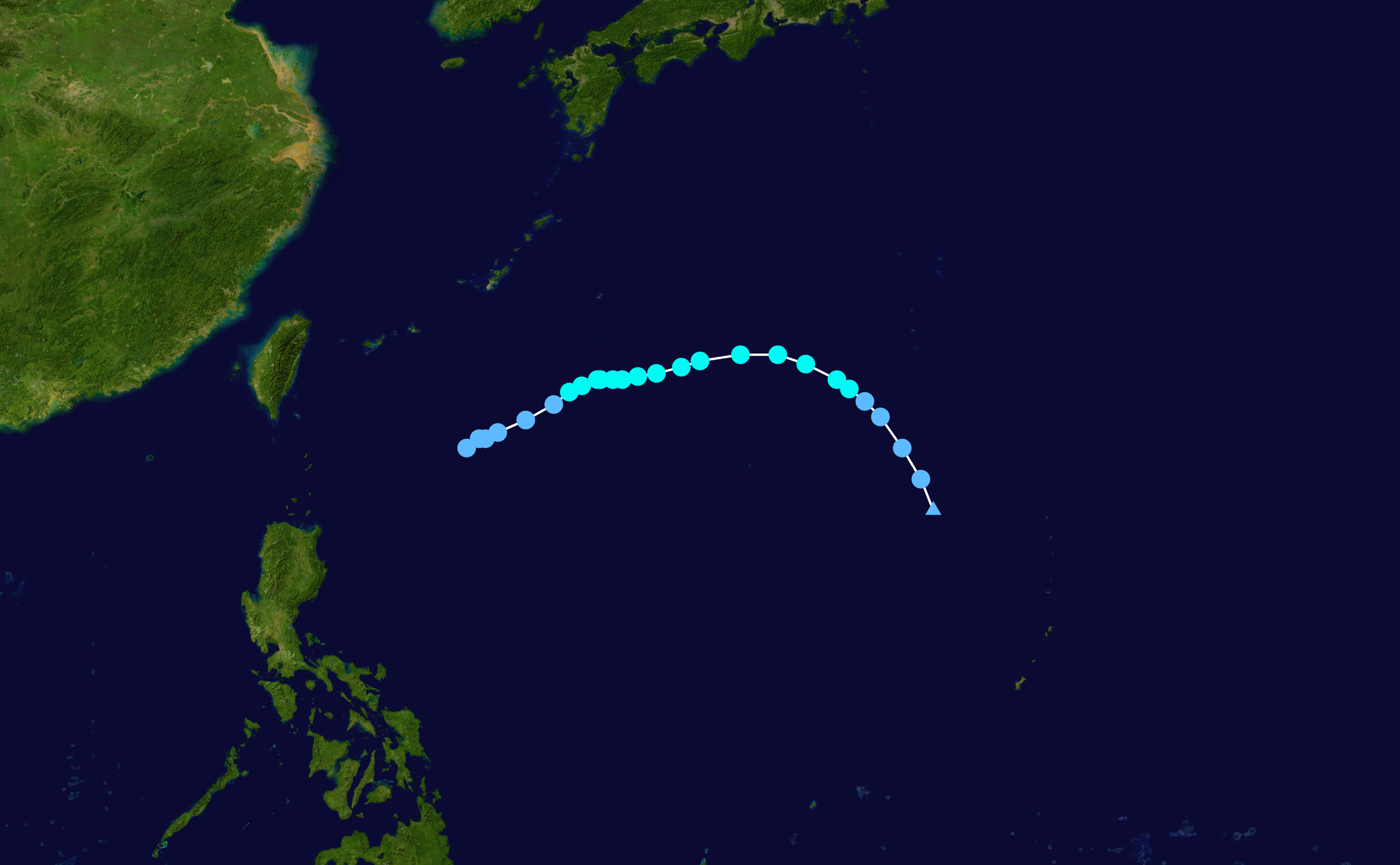
- Duration: August 8 – August 14
- Peak intensity: 95 km/h (60 mph) (1-min); 988 hPa (mbar)

Chris was a tropical storm.

=== Tropical Storm Dolores–Eunice ===
- Typhoon (JMA)
- Tropical storm (SSHWS)
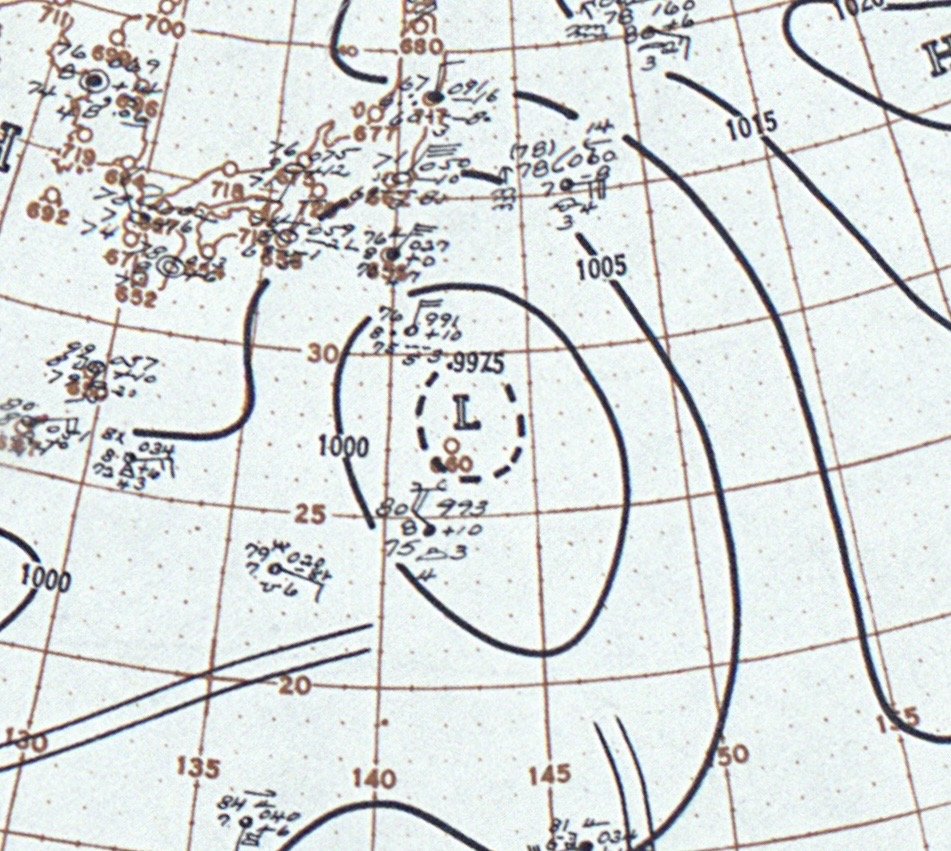
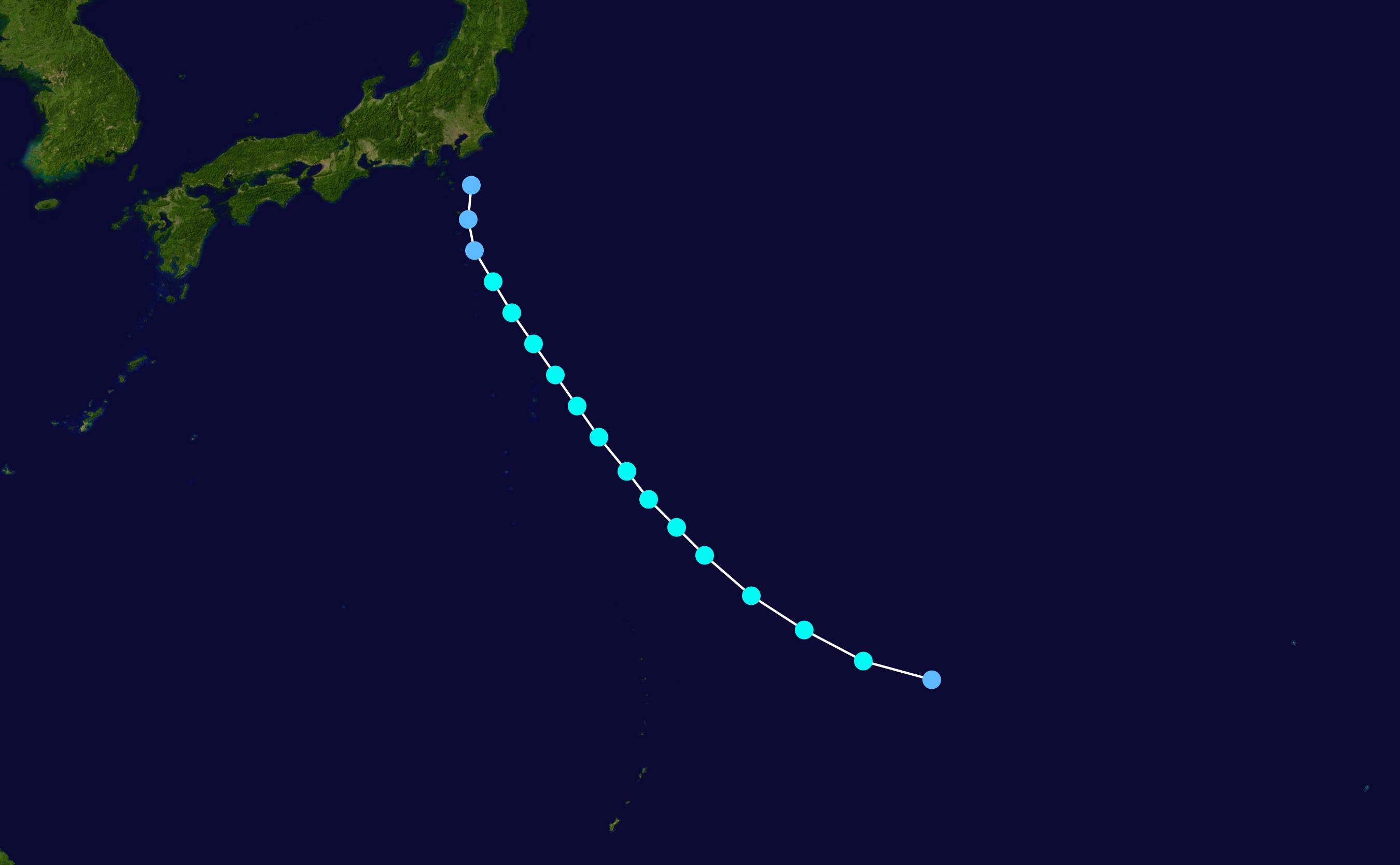
- Duration: August 10 – August 14
- Peak intensity: 85 km/h (50 mph) (1-min); 990 hPa (mbar)

Tropical Storm Dolores was tracked by the Air Weather Service located on Guam. At one point, a tropical storm was identified and assigned the name Eunice. The storm moved northwest and dissipated south of Japan. Post analysis showed that Tropical Storm Dolores was north of the forecast location and was synonymous with the system assigned Eunice.

=== Tropical Storm Flo ===
- Typhoon (JMA)
- Tropical storm (SSHWS)
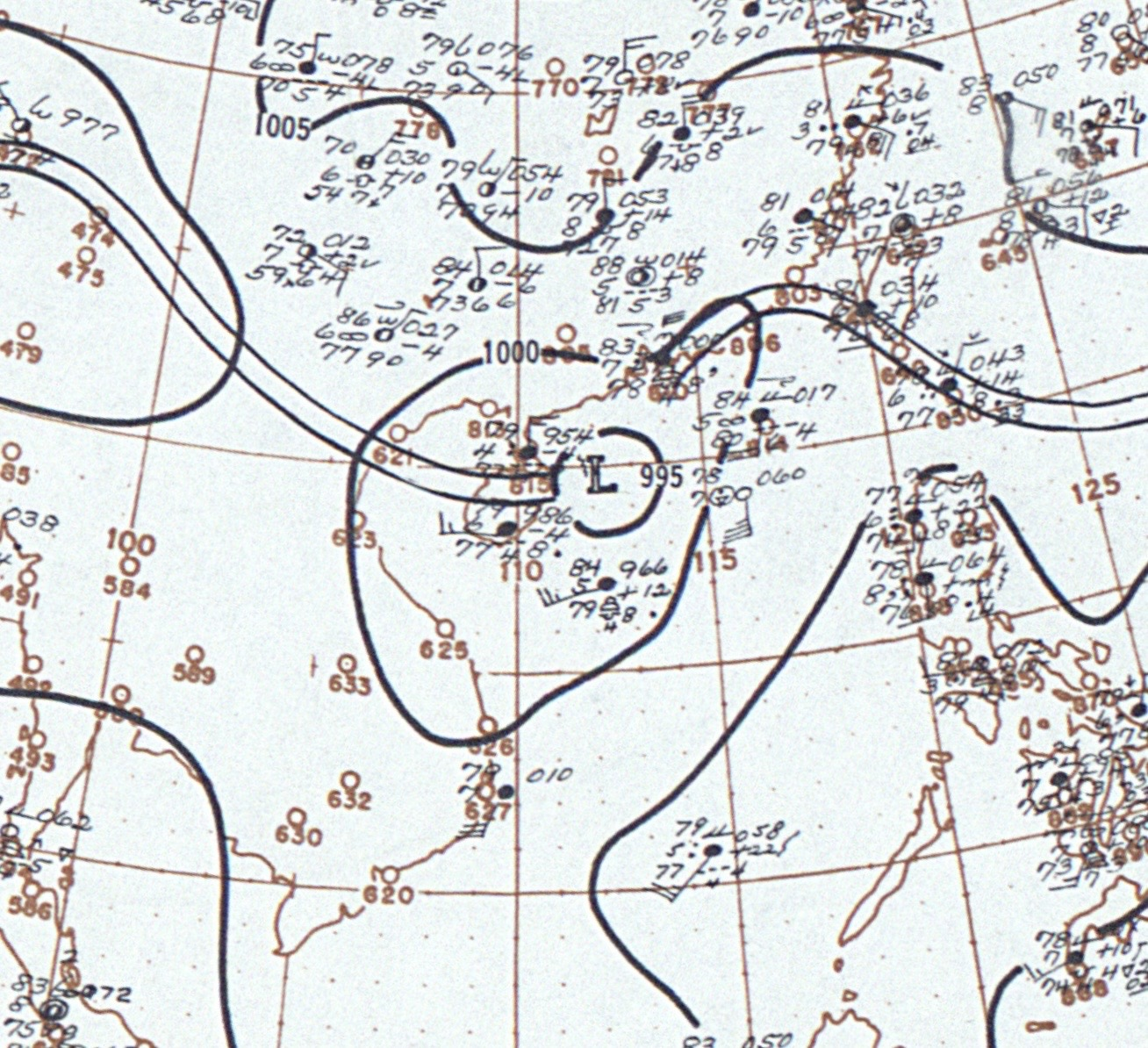
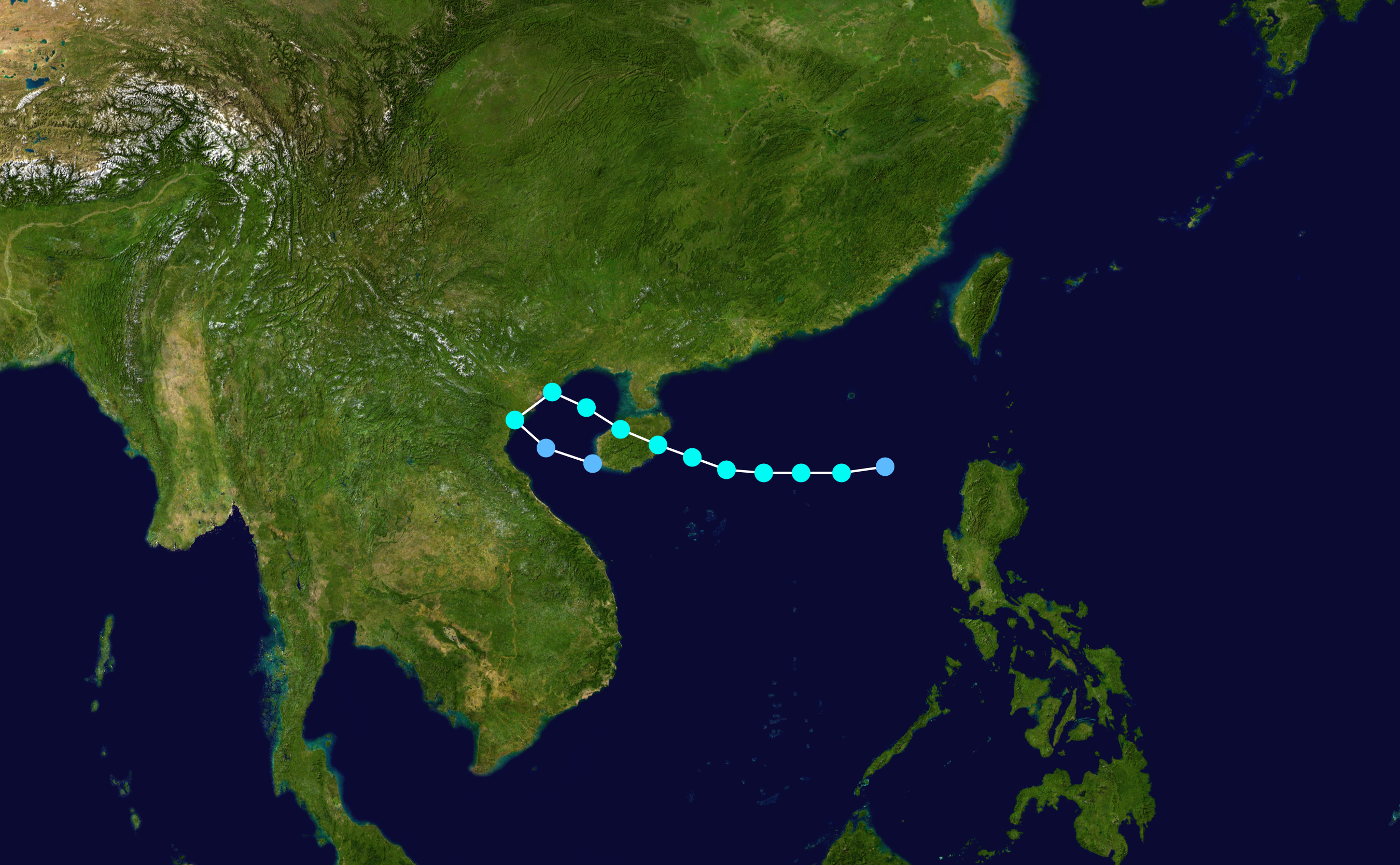
- Duration: August 20 – August 23
- Peak intensity: 95 km/h (60 mph) (1-min); 990 hPa (mbar)

Flo hit China as a tropical storm (despite being classified by JMA as a Typhoon Flo).

=== Typhoon Gertrude ===
- Typhoon (JMA)
- Category 2 typhoon (SSHWS)
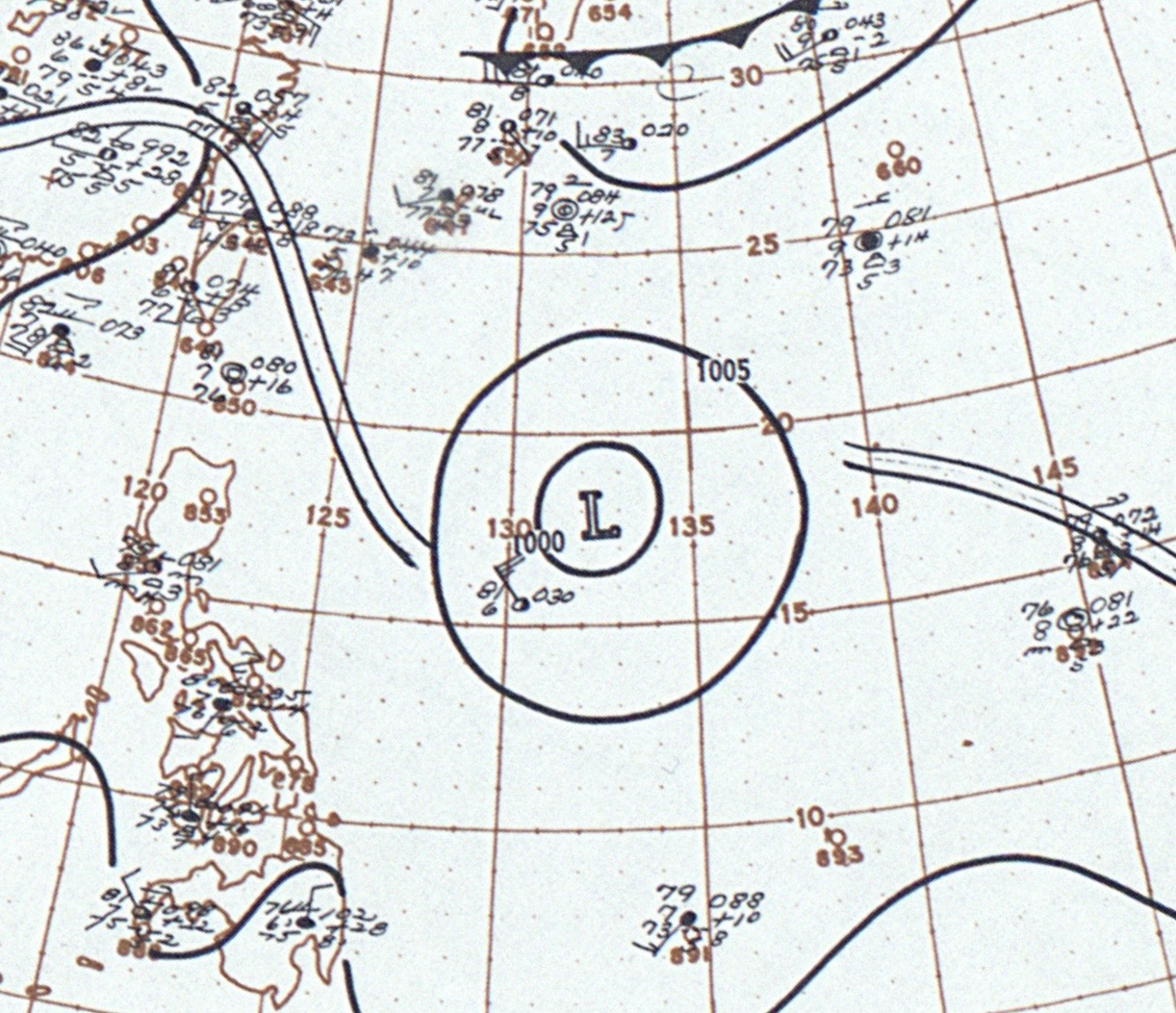
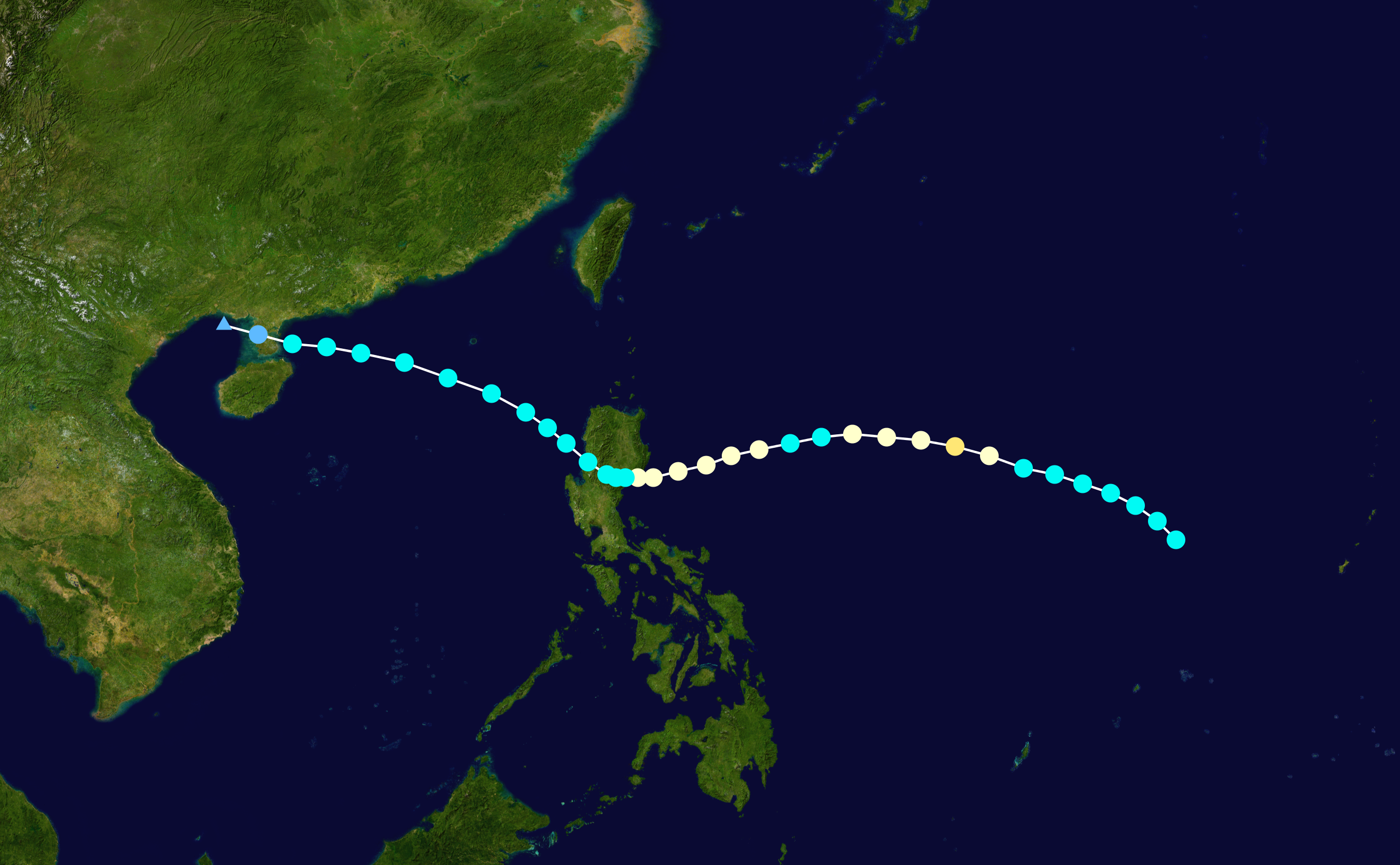
- Duration: August 27 – September 4
- Peak intensity: 155 km/h (100 mph) (1-min); 976 hPa (mbar)

Gertrude formed on August 27 east of the Philippines. It moved west while reaching peak intensity as a Category 2 typhoon. It later weakened and re-strengthened to a Category 1 typhoon. After passing Luzon, Gertrude moved west-northwest and hit China as a tropical storm. It dissipated on September 4.

=== Typhoon Hazel ===
- Typhoon (JMA)
- Category 1 typhoon (SSHWS)
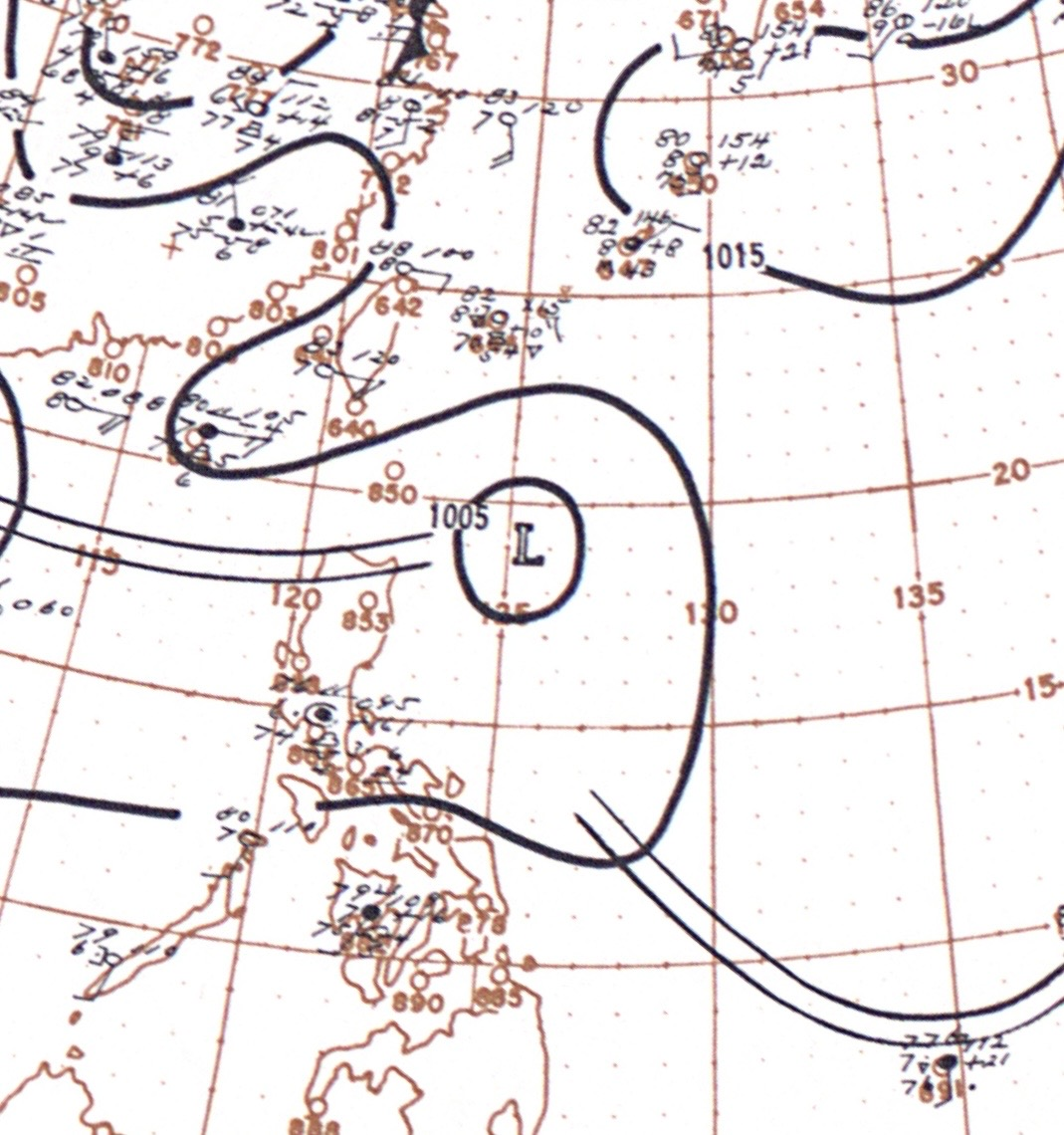
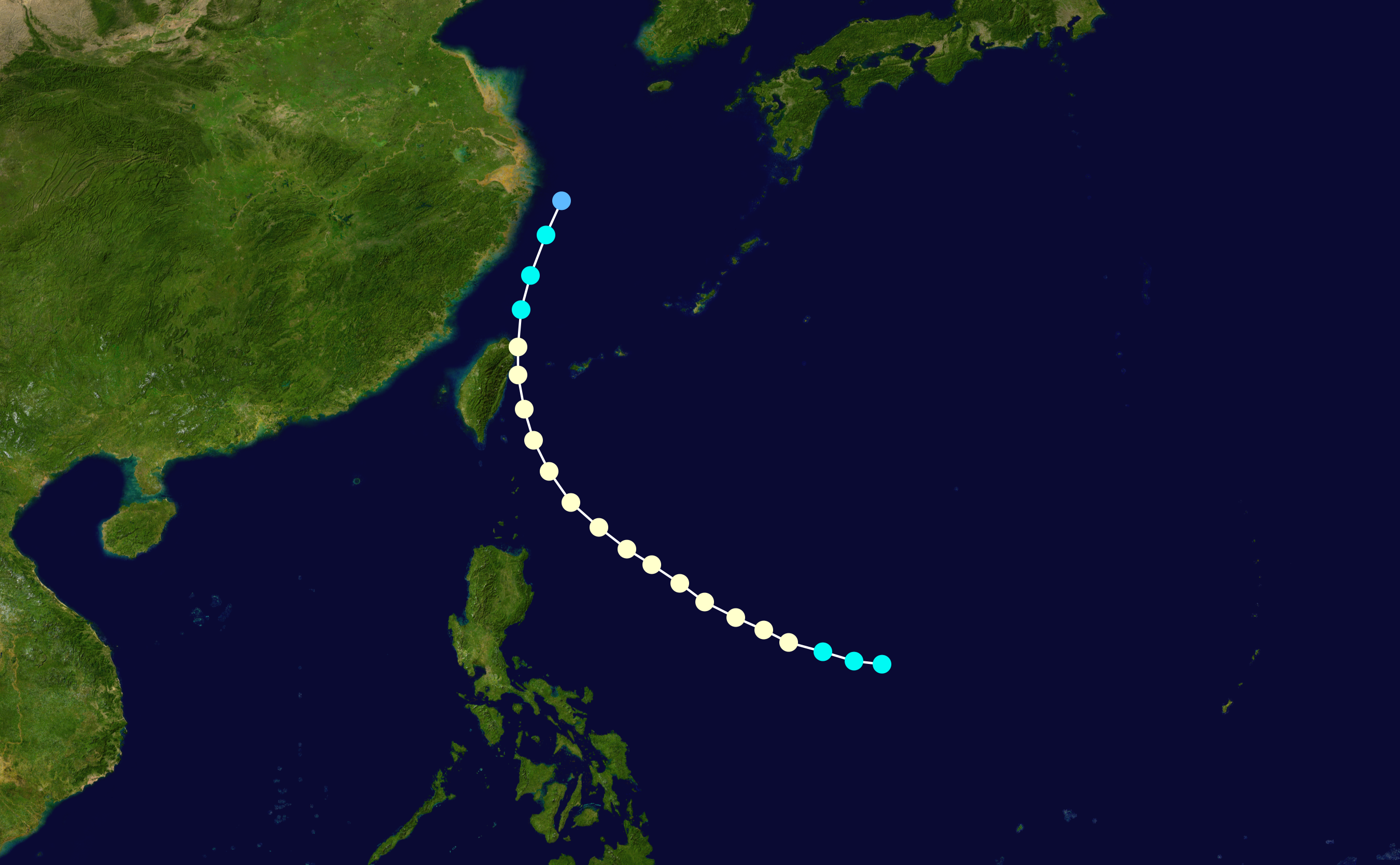
- Duration: September 2 – September 7
- Peak intensity: 150 km/h (90 mph) (1-min); 966 hPa (mbar)

Hazel hit Taiwan as a category 1 typhoon.

=== Typhoon Ione ===
- Typhoon (JMA)
- Category 4 typhoon (SSHWS)
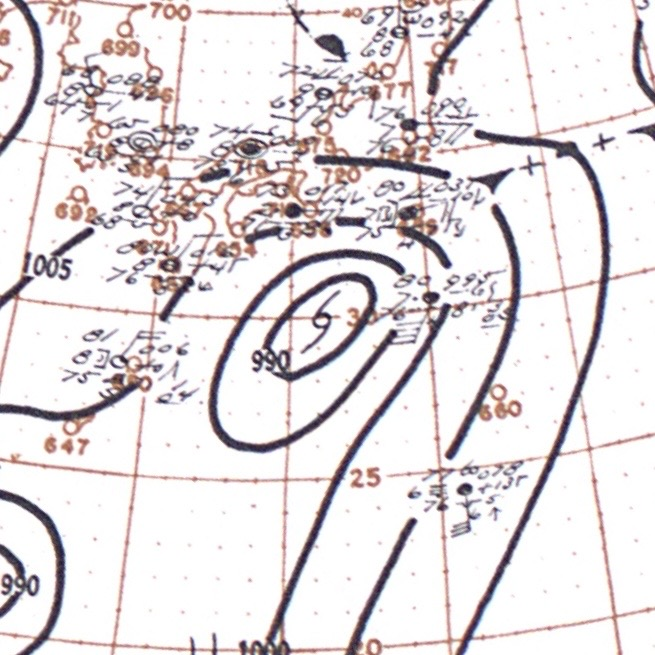
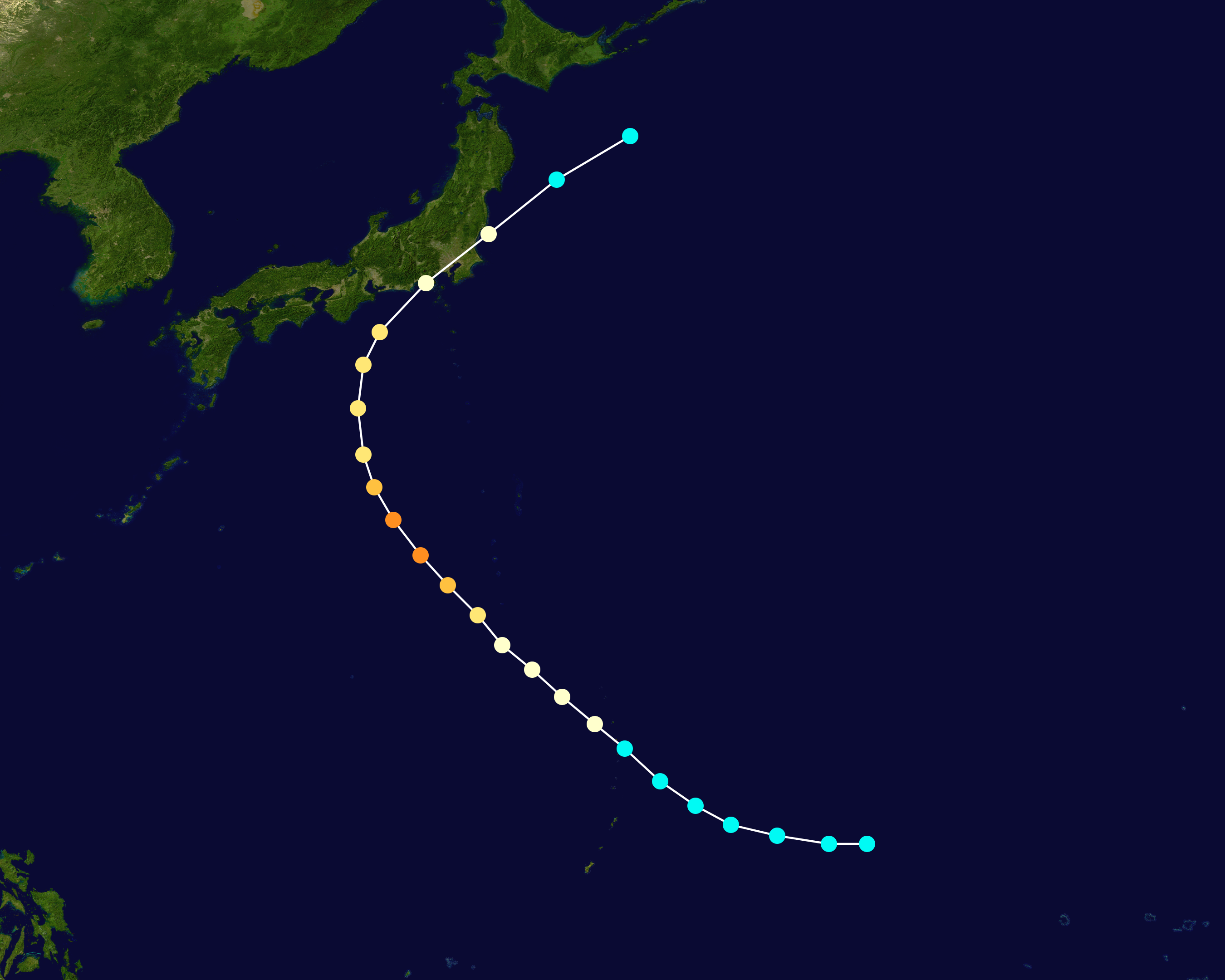
- Duration: September 11 – September 17
- Peak intensity: 220 km/h (140 mph) (1-min); 925 hPa (mbar)

A Tropical Storm formed on September 11 and soon turned toward Japan as it gained strength. Ione soon reached category 4 intensity on September 14. Ione then began to lose strength and became a category 1 on September 16. Then, Ione struck Japan in that day killing 838 people. Ione further weakened and became a Tropical Storm on the 17th. Ione then dissipated.

=== Typhoon Jackie ===
- Typhoon (JMA)
- Category 1 typhoon (SSHWS)
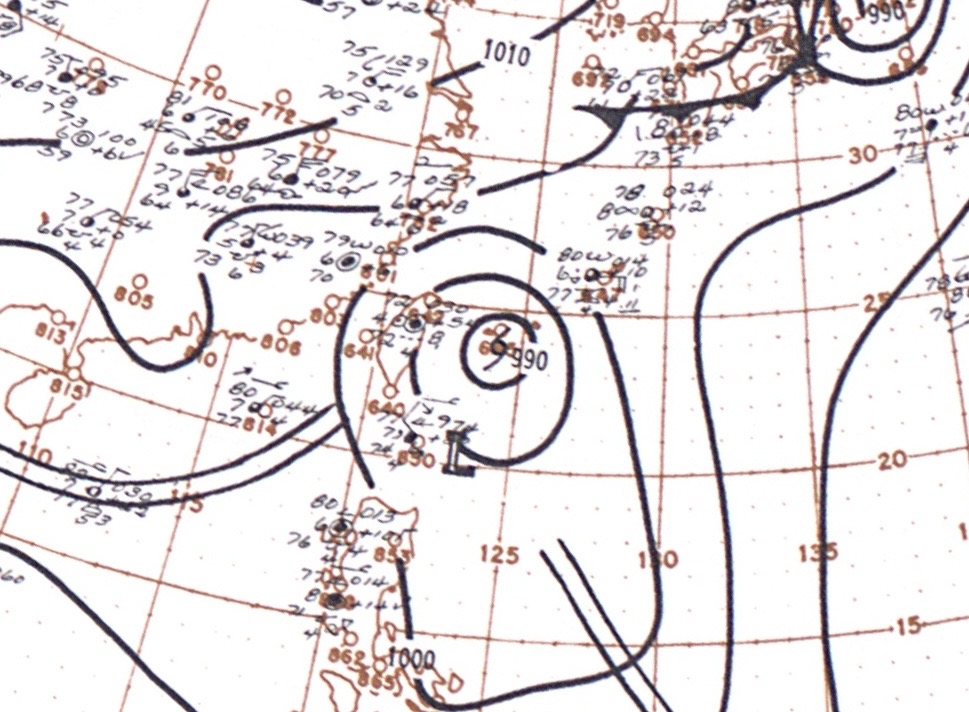
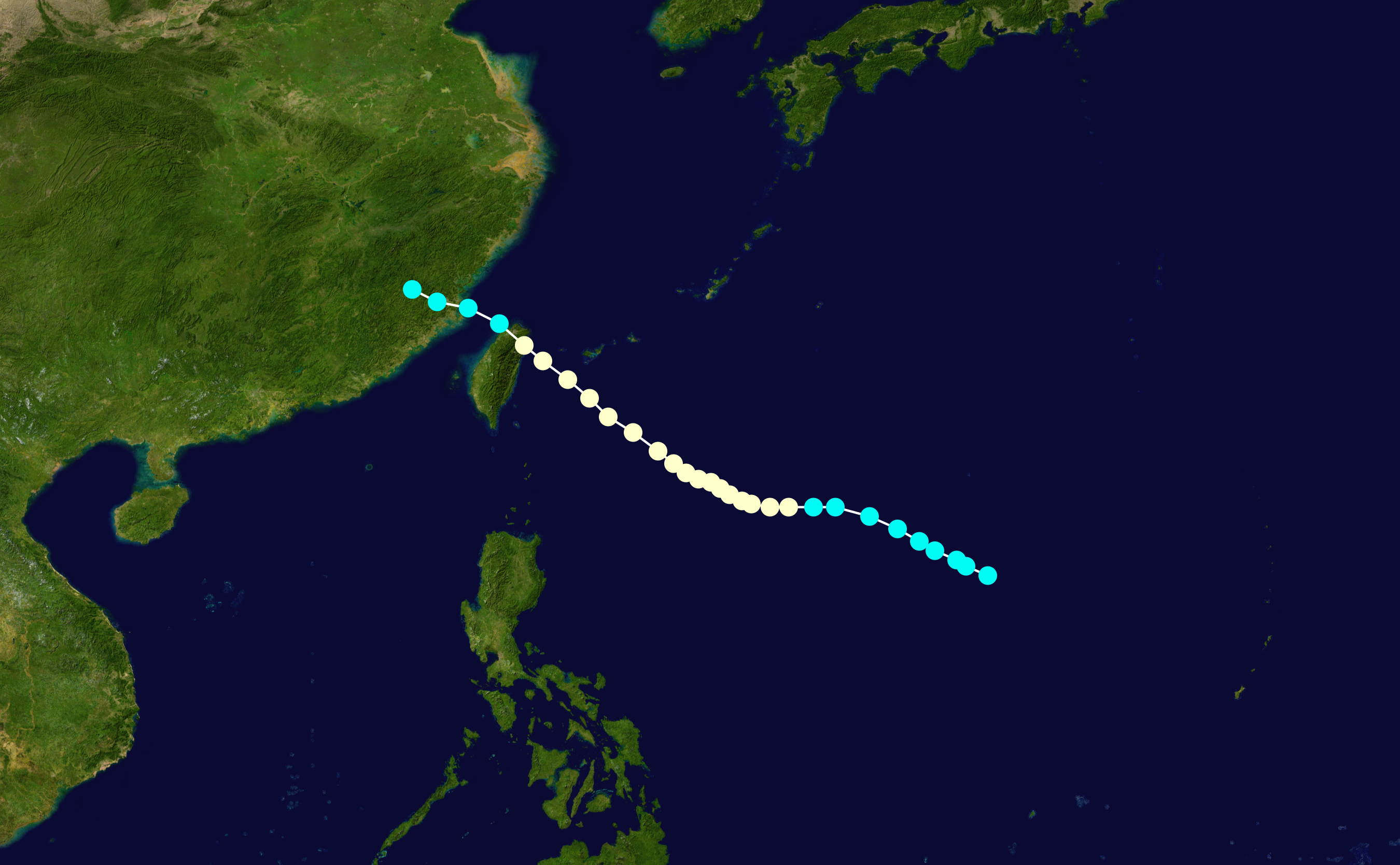
- Duration: September 11 – September 18
- Peak intensity: 150 km/h (90 mph) (1-min); 962 hPa (mbar)

Jackie hit China as a category 1 typhoon.

=== Tropical Storm Kit ===
- Typhoon (JMA)
- Tropical storm (SSHWS)
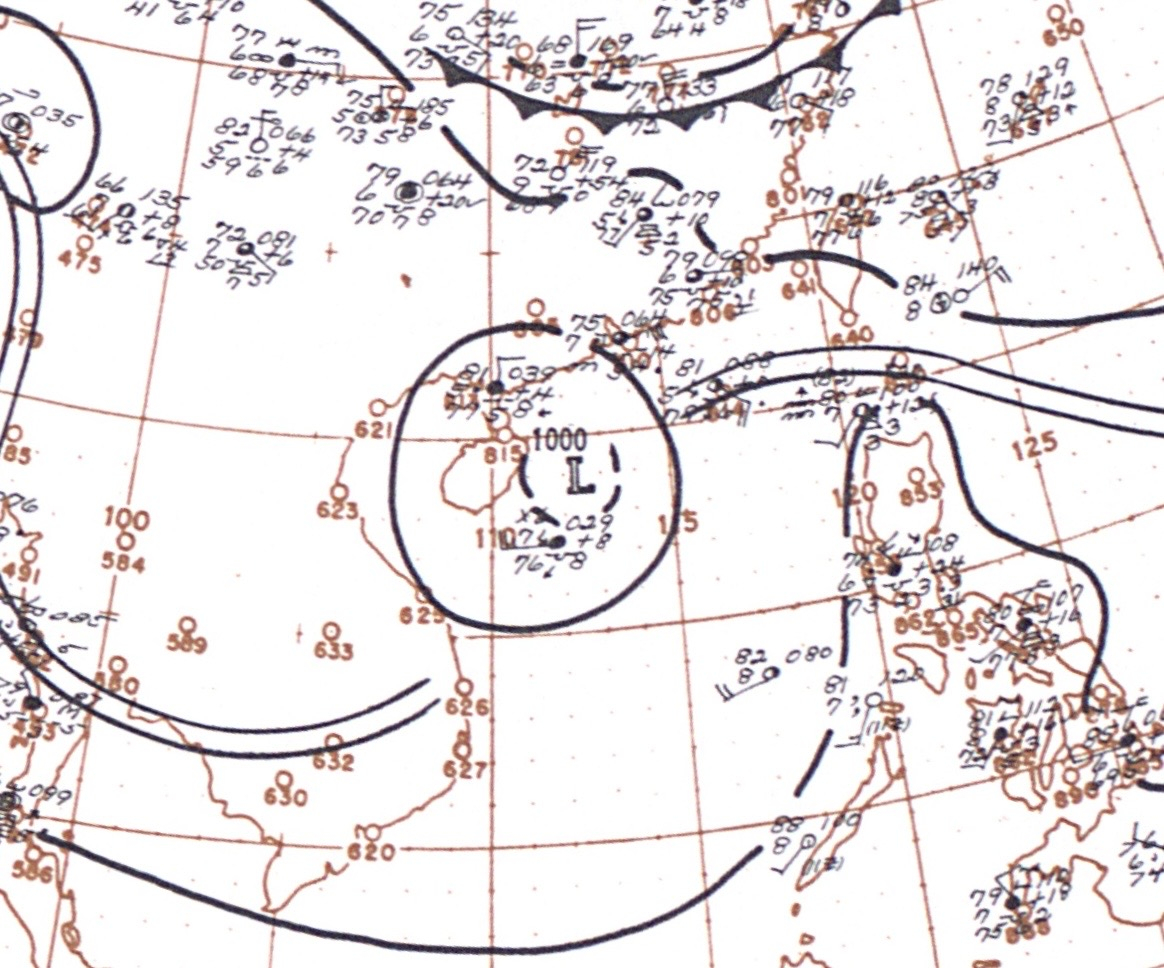
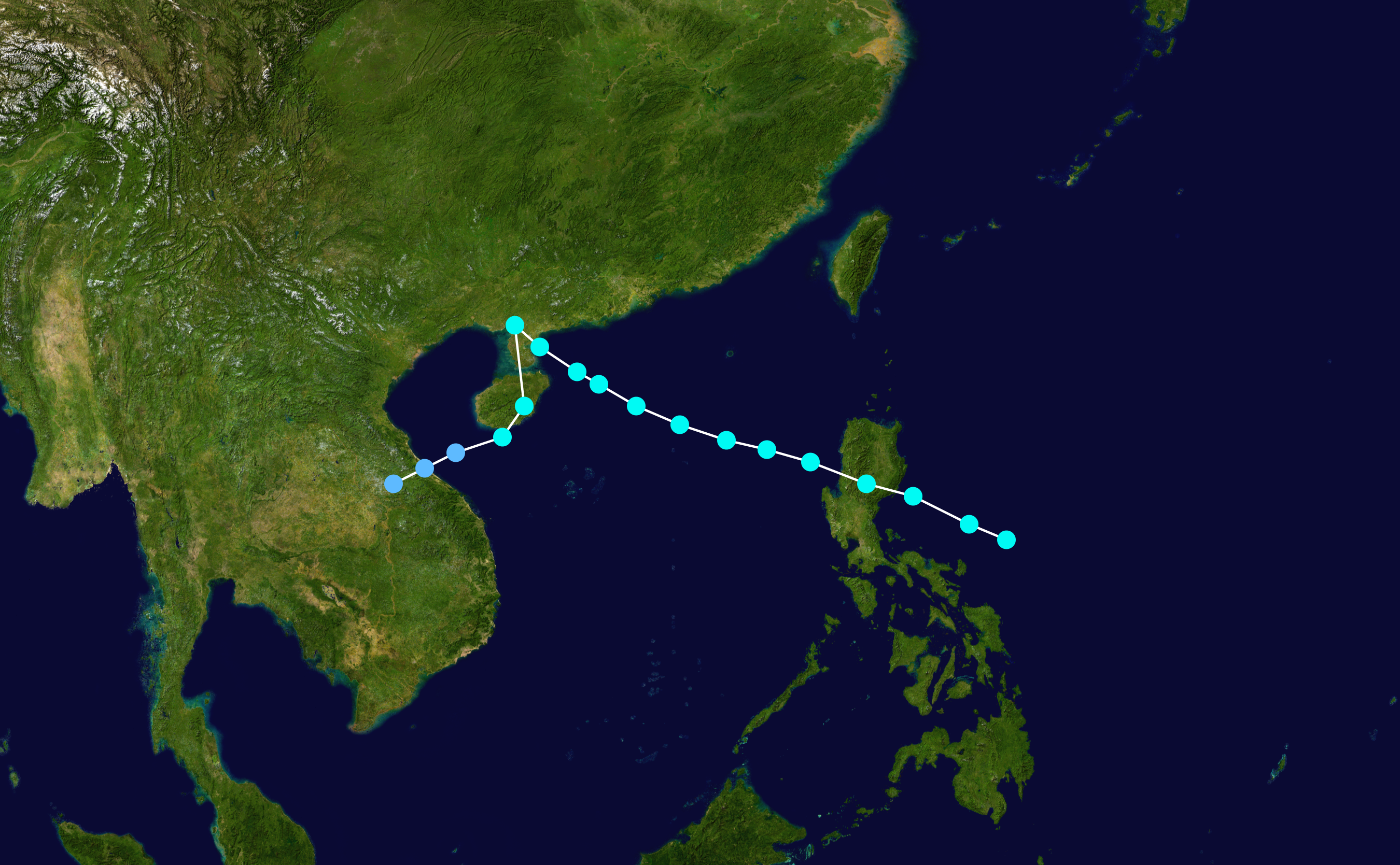
- Duration: September 24 – September 28
- Peak intensity: 110 km/h (70 mph) (1-min); 989 hPa (mbar)

Kit hit the Philippines and China as a tropical storm. After making landfall in China, the storm took an unusual track, moved south-southwest and struck Vietnam as a tropical depression.

=== Typhoon Libby ===
- Typhoon (JMA)
- Category 4 typhoon (SSHWS)
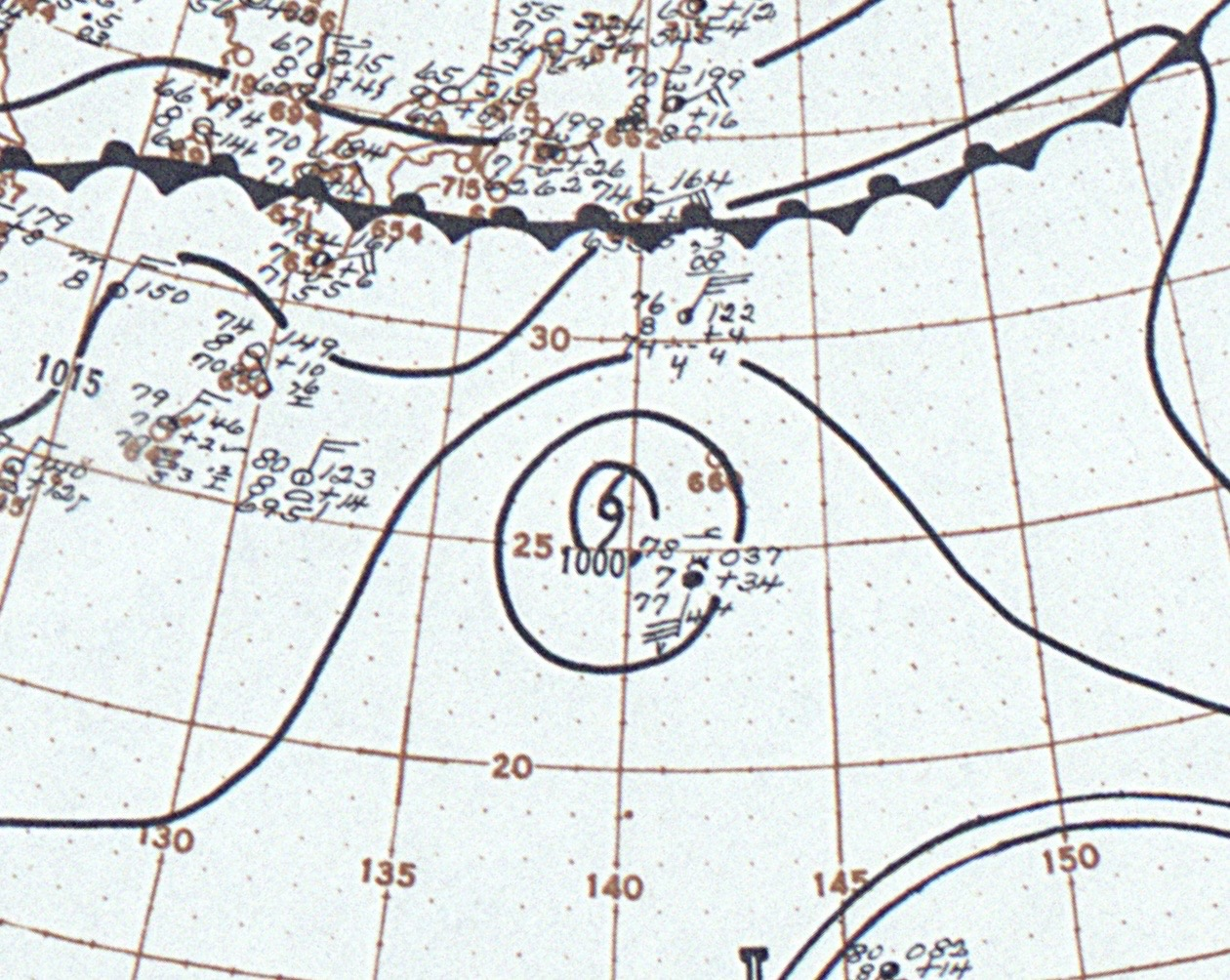
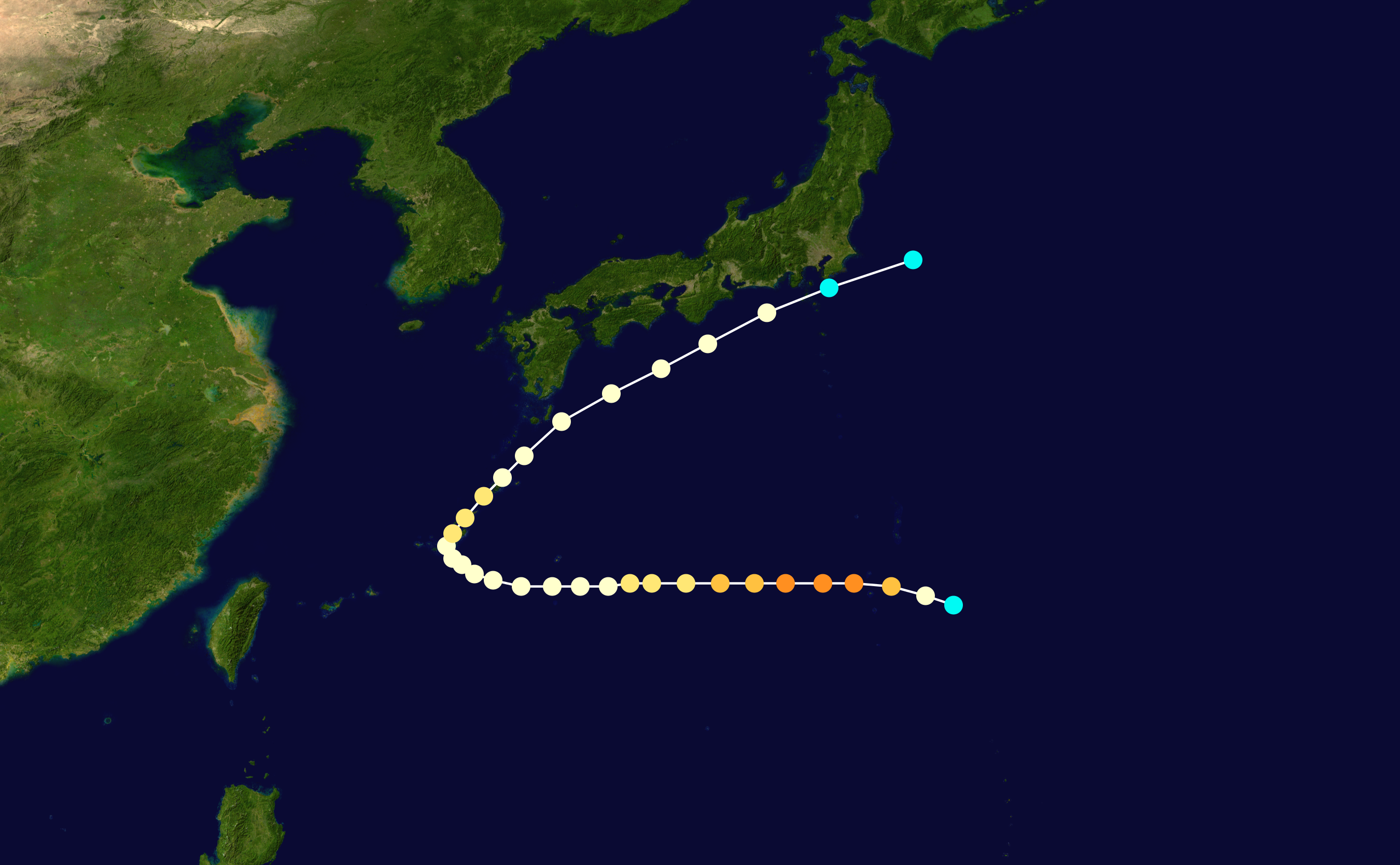
- Duration: September 29 – October 7
- Peak intensity: 230 km/h (145 mph) (1-min); 924 hPa (mbar)

Libby formed southeast of Japan on September 29. The storm moved west as it quickly strengthened into a Category 4 typhoon. It later weakened and turned northeast.

=== Typhoon Martha ===
- Typhoon (JMA)
- Category 3 typhoon (SSHWS)
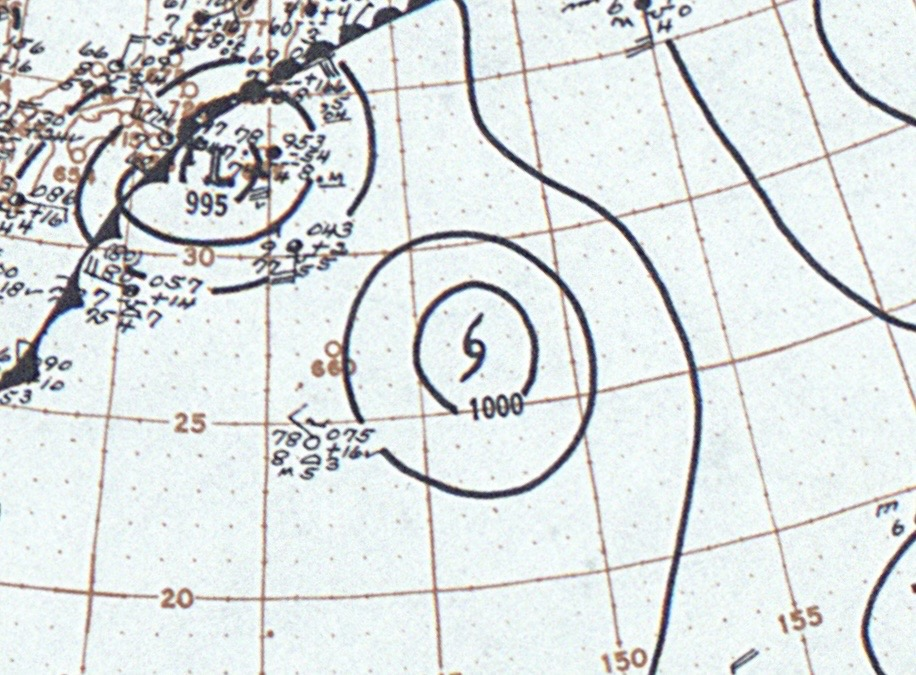
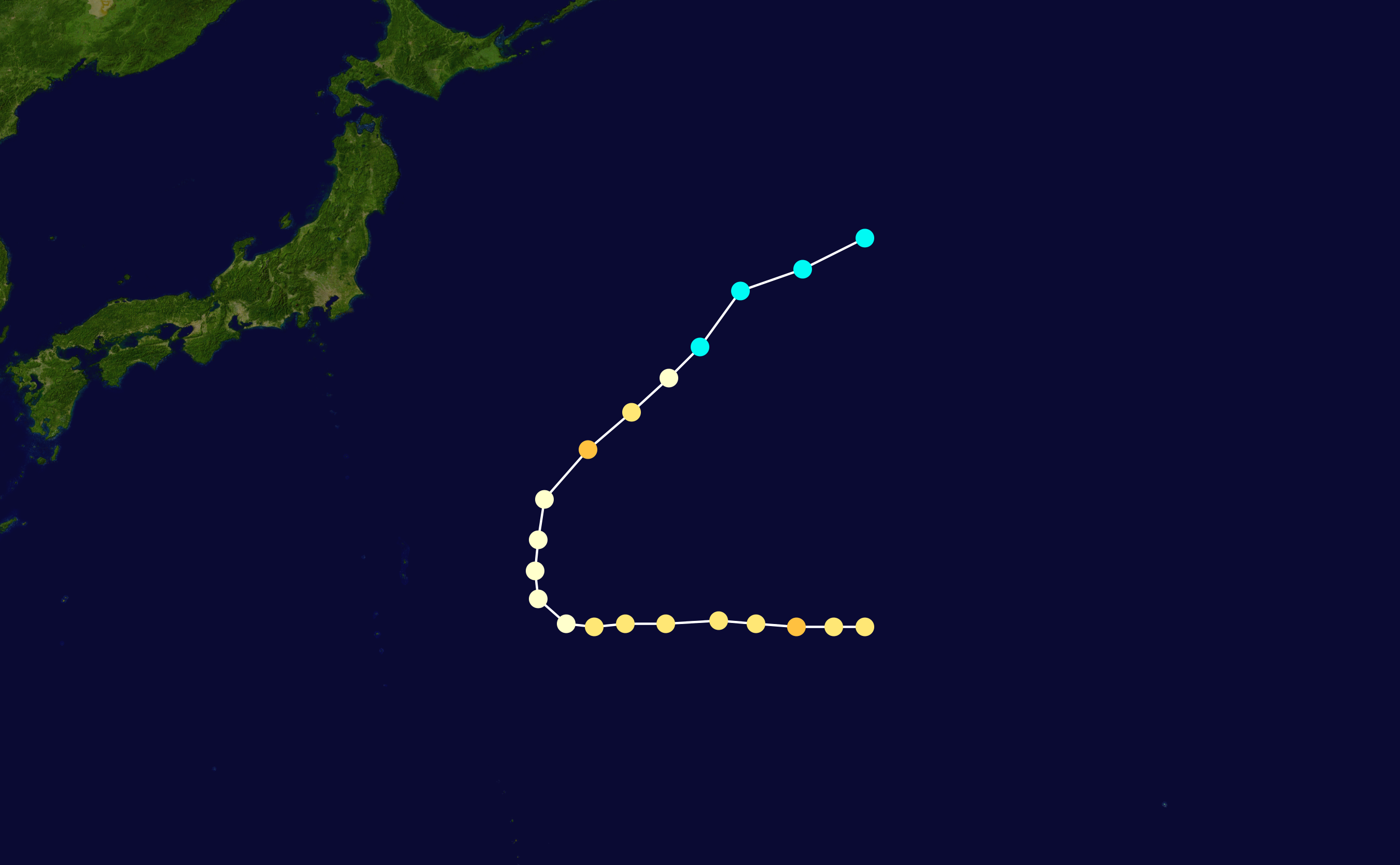
- Duration: October 4 – October 8
- Peak intensity: 185 km/h (115 mph) (1-min); 943 hPa (mbar)

Martha was a Category 3 typhoon that didn't affect land.

=== Tropical Storm Norma ===
- Typhoon (JMA)
- Tropical storm (SSHWS)
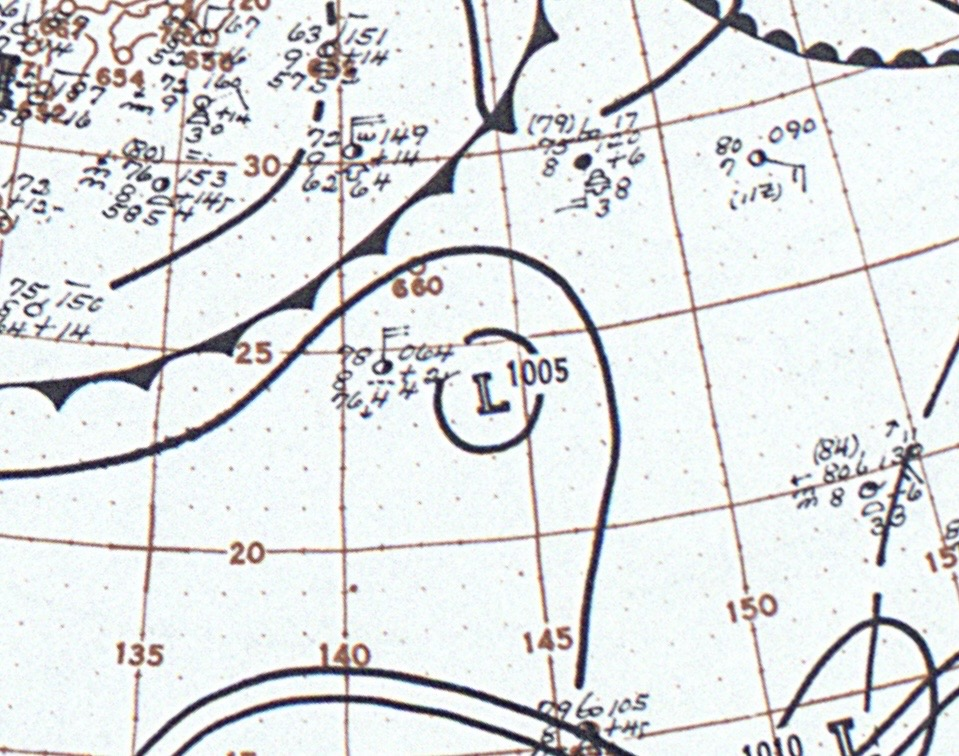
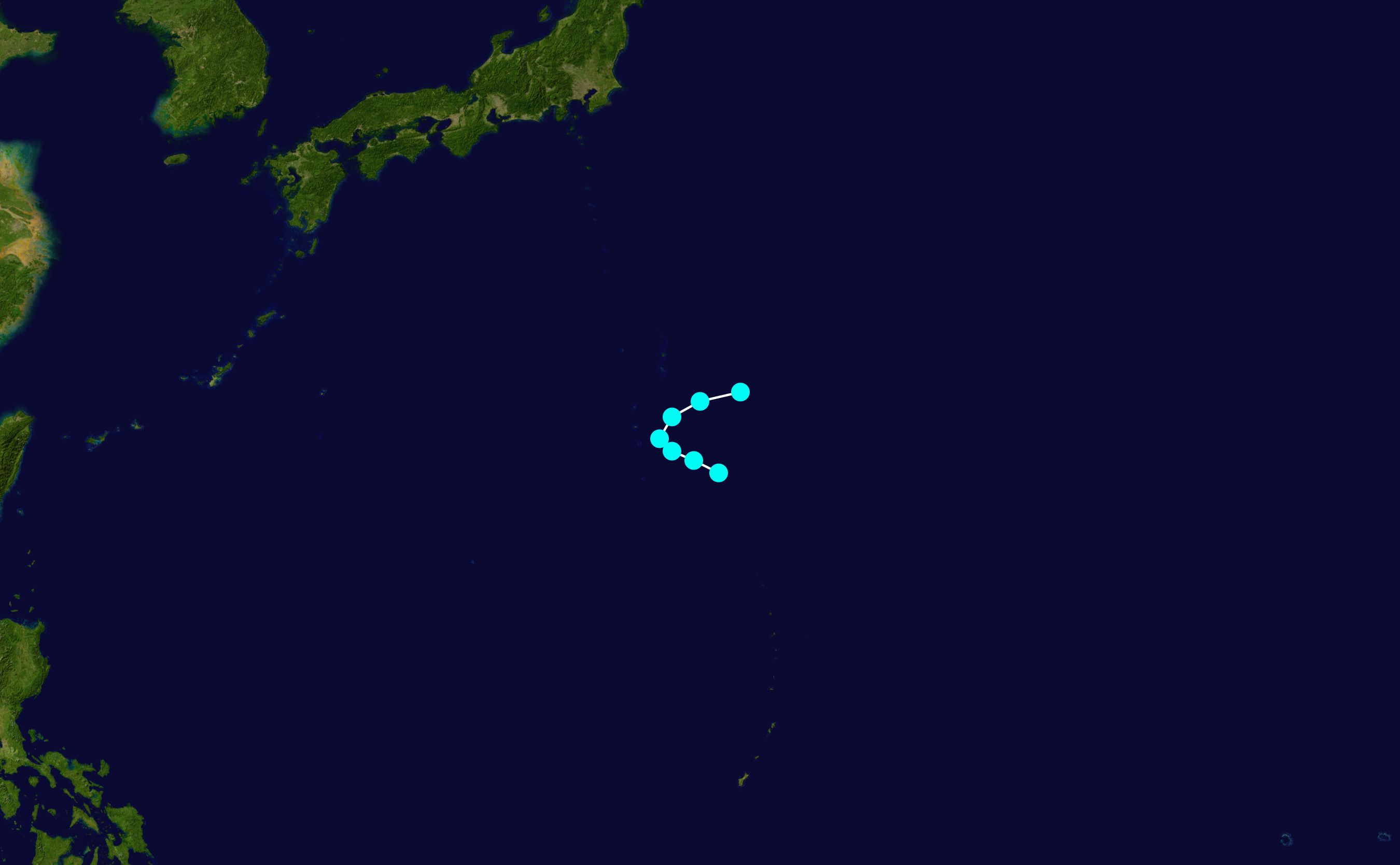
- Duration: October 11 – October 12
- Peak intensity: 95 km/h (60 mph) (1-min); 992 hPa (mbar)

Norma was a short-lived tropical storm.

=== Tropical Storm Olga ===
- Tropical storm (SSHWS)
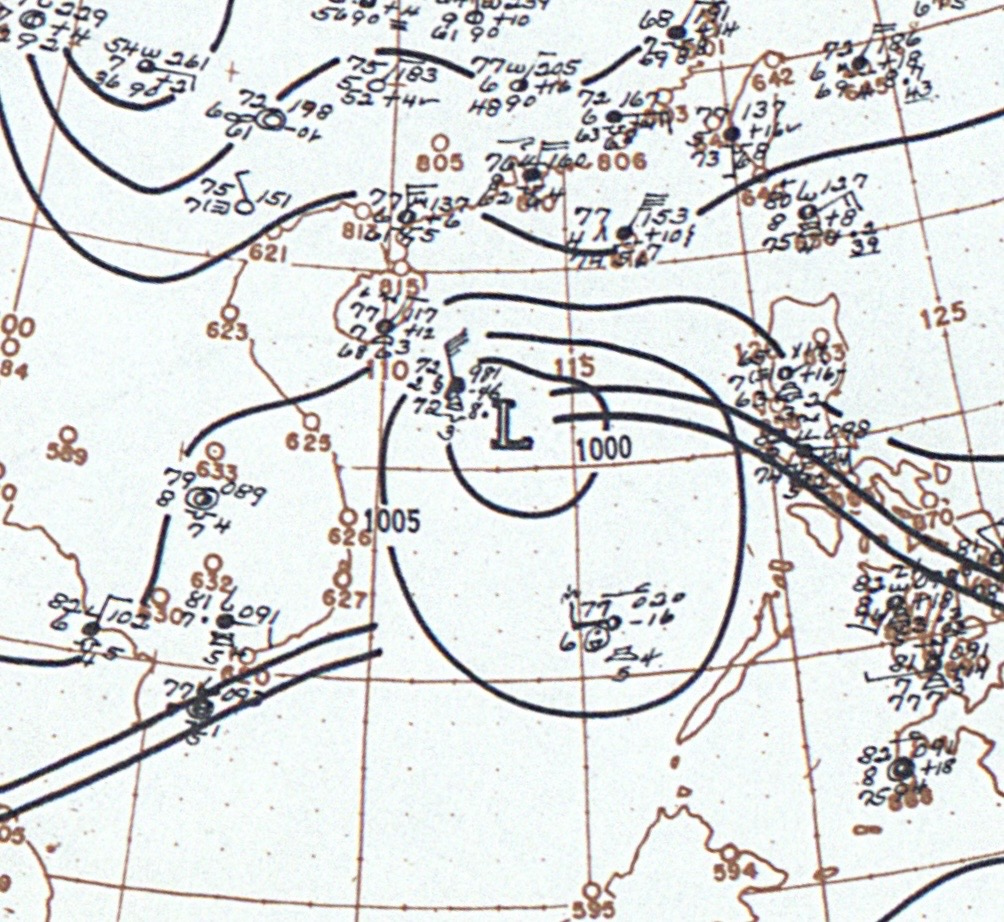
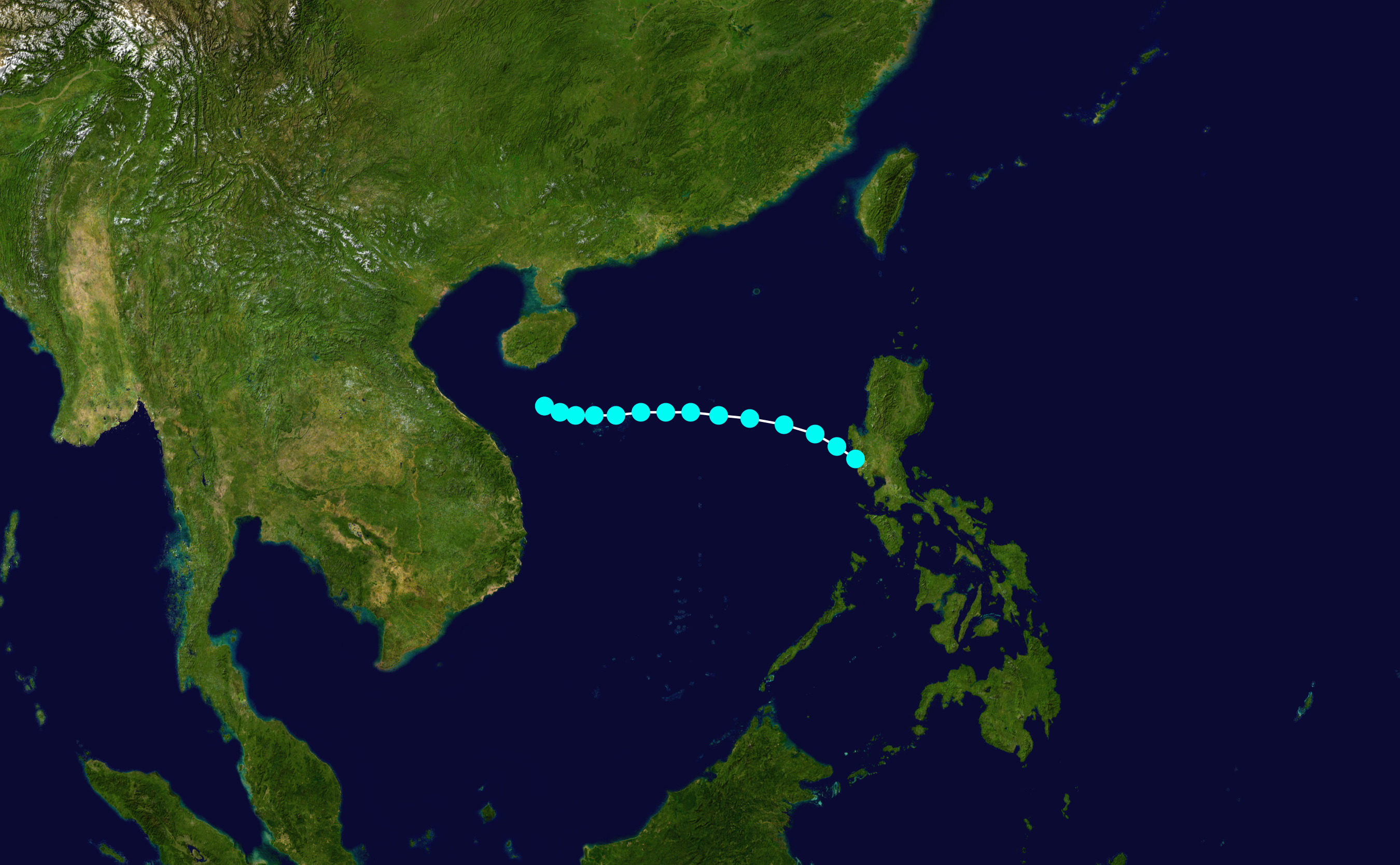
- Duration: October 16 – October 19
- Peak intensity: 100 km/h (65 mph) (1-min); 994 hPa (mbar)

Olga formed in the South China Sea on October 16. It moved west and dissipated on October 19.

=== Tropical Storm Pat ===
- Typhoon (JMA)
- Tropical storm (SSHWS)
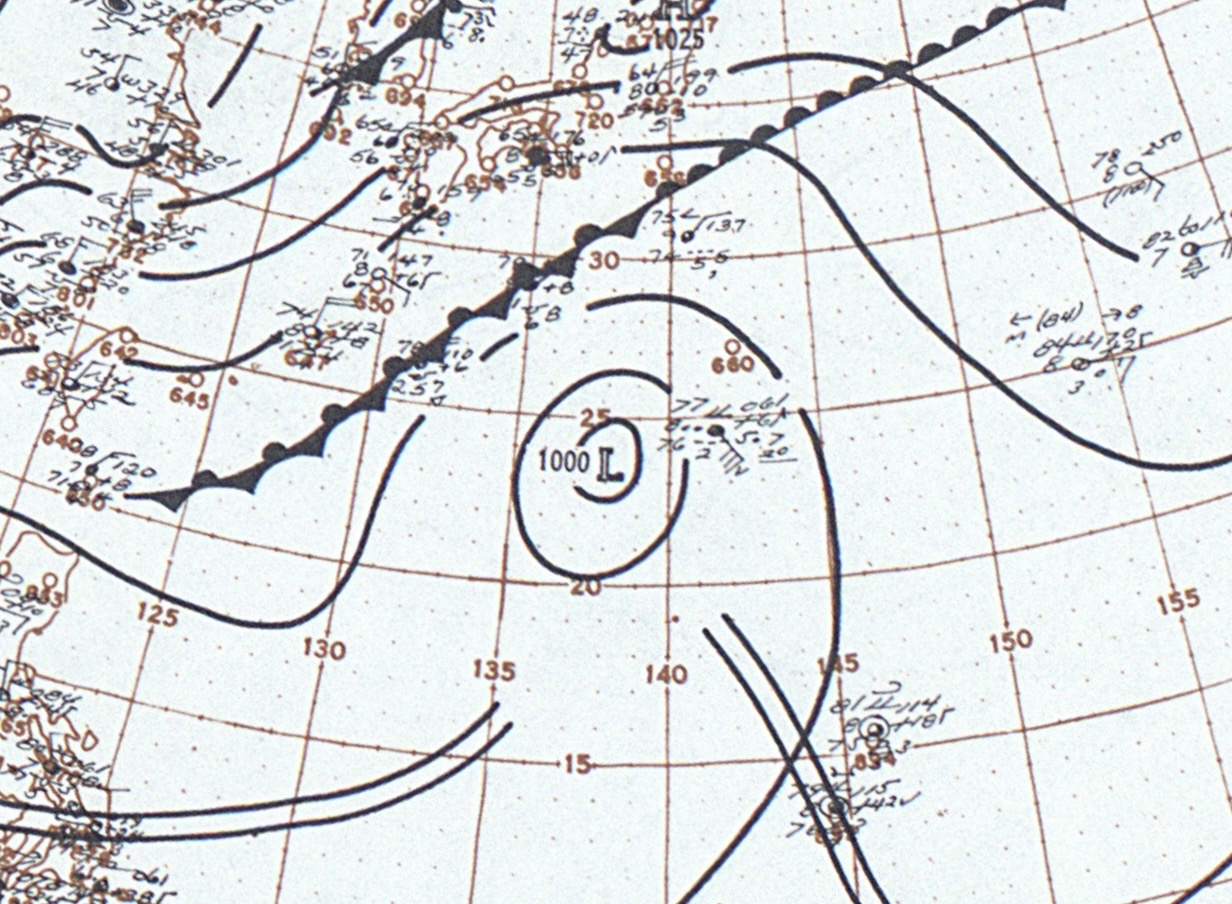
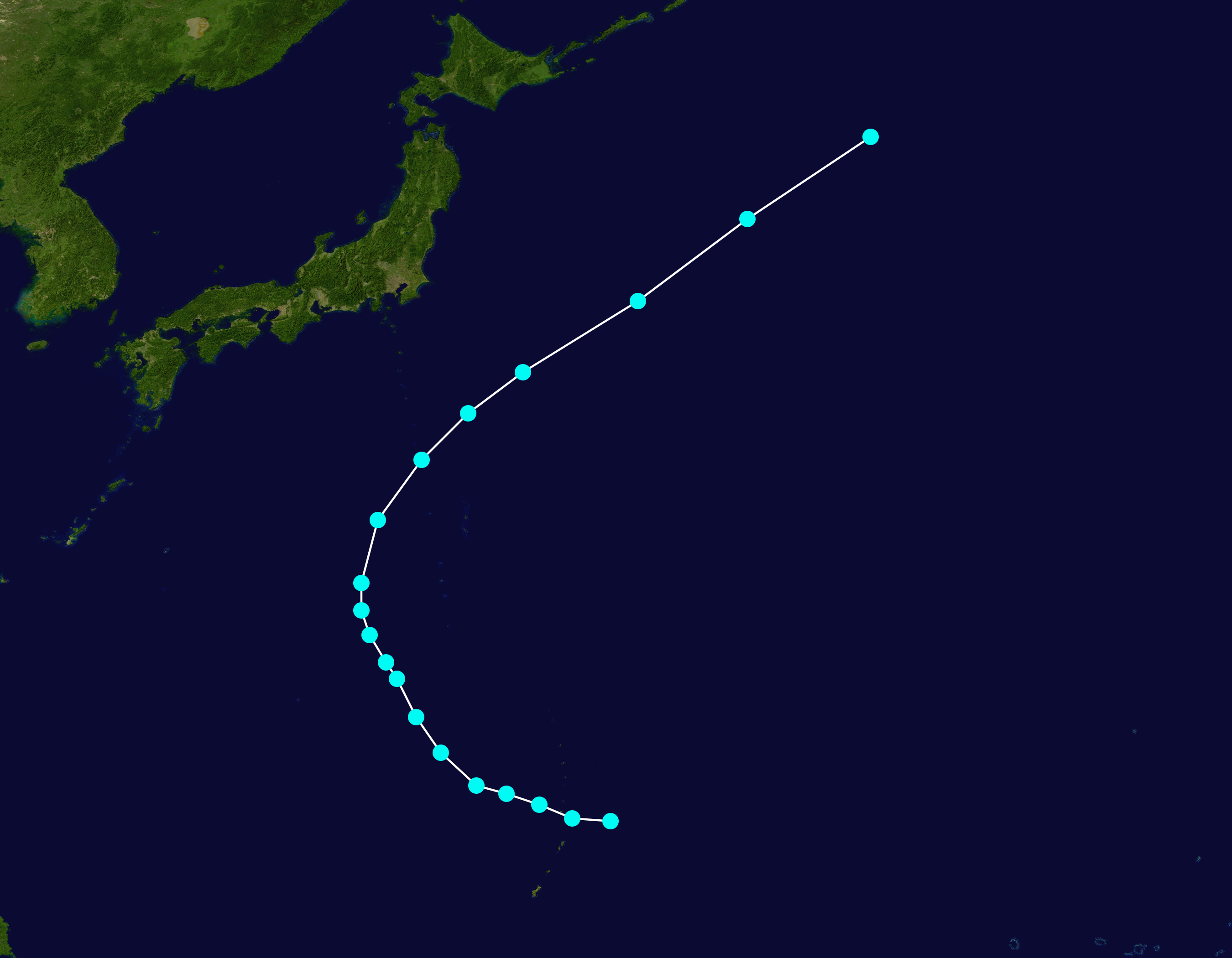
- Duration: October 27 – October 31
- Peak intensity: 110 km/h (70 mph) (1-min); 987 hPa (mbar)

Pat was a tropical storm that stayed out at sea.

=== Typhoon Rita ===
- Typhoon (JMA)
- Category 3 typhoon (SSHWS)
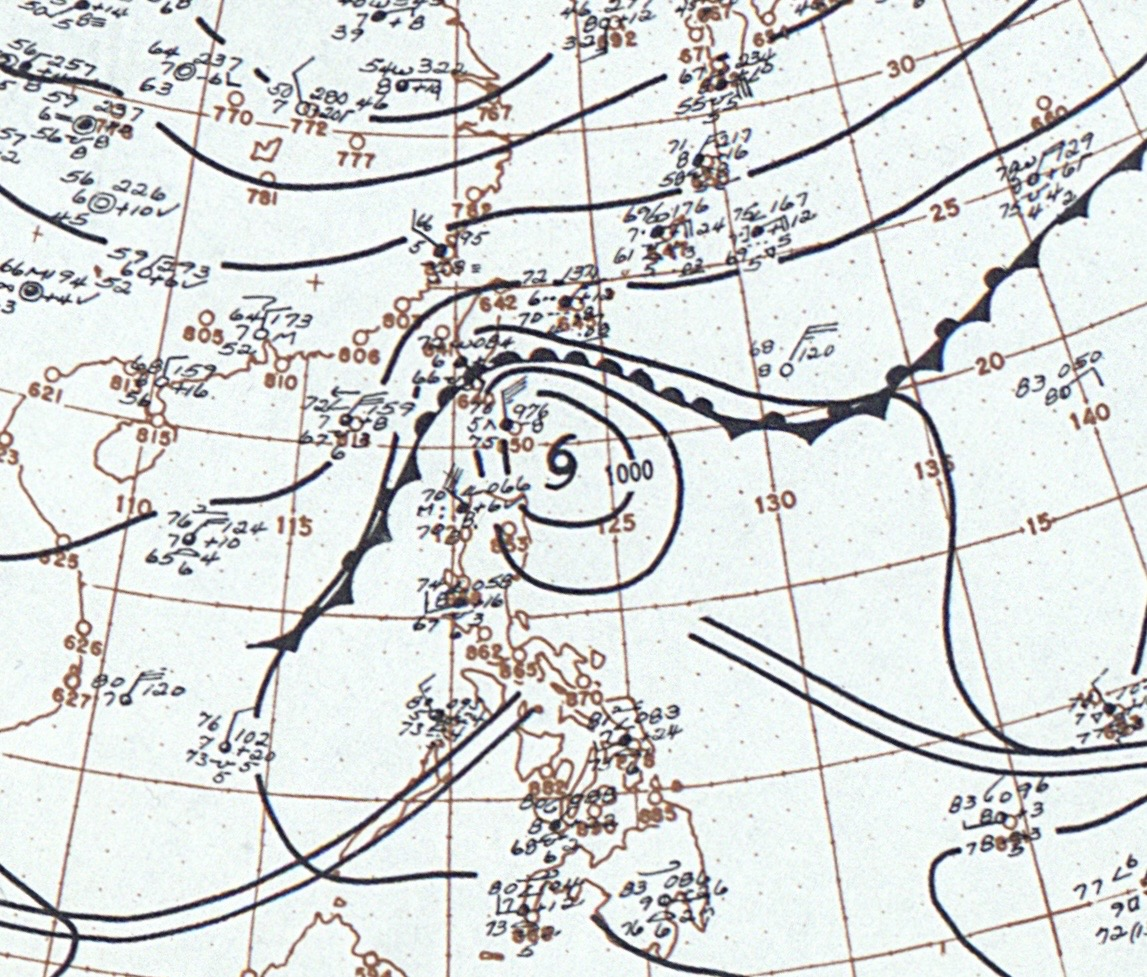
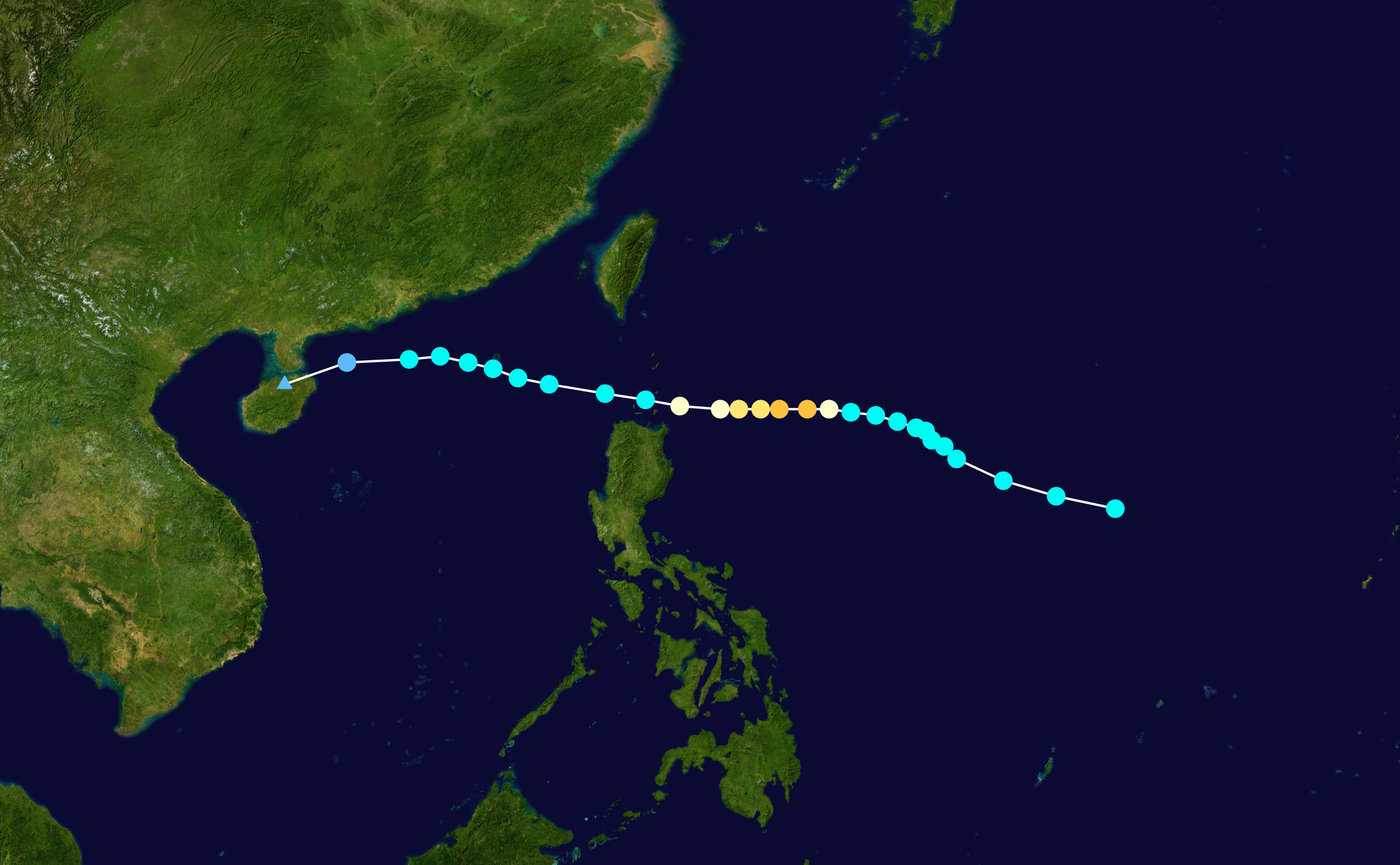
- Duration: November 4 – November 11
- Peak intensity: 185 km/h (115 mph) (1-min); 957 hPa (mbar)

Rita was a category 3 typhoon that didn't make landfall.

=== Typhoon Agnes ===
- Typhoon (JMA)
- Category 2 typhoon (SSHWS)
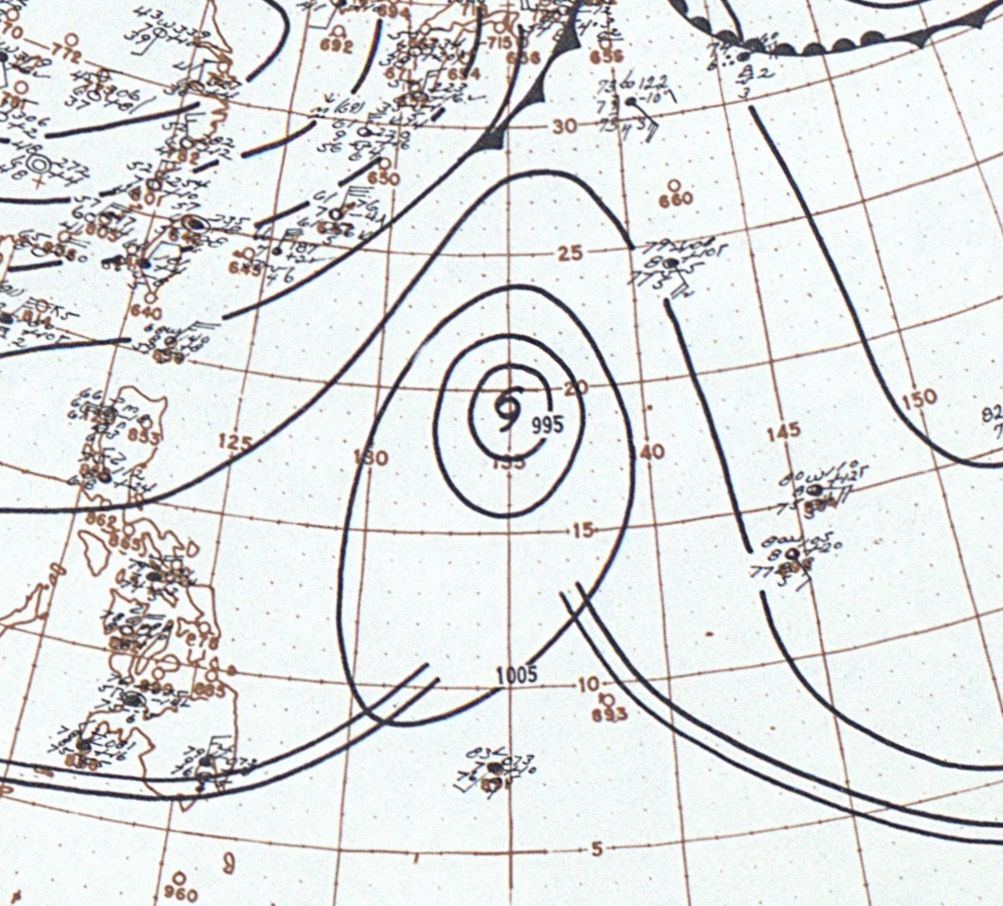
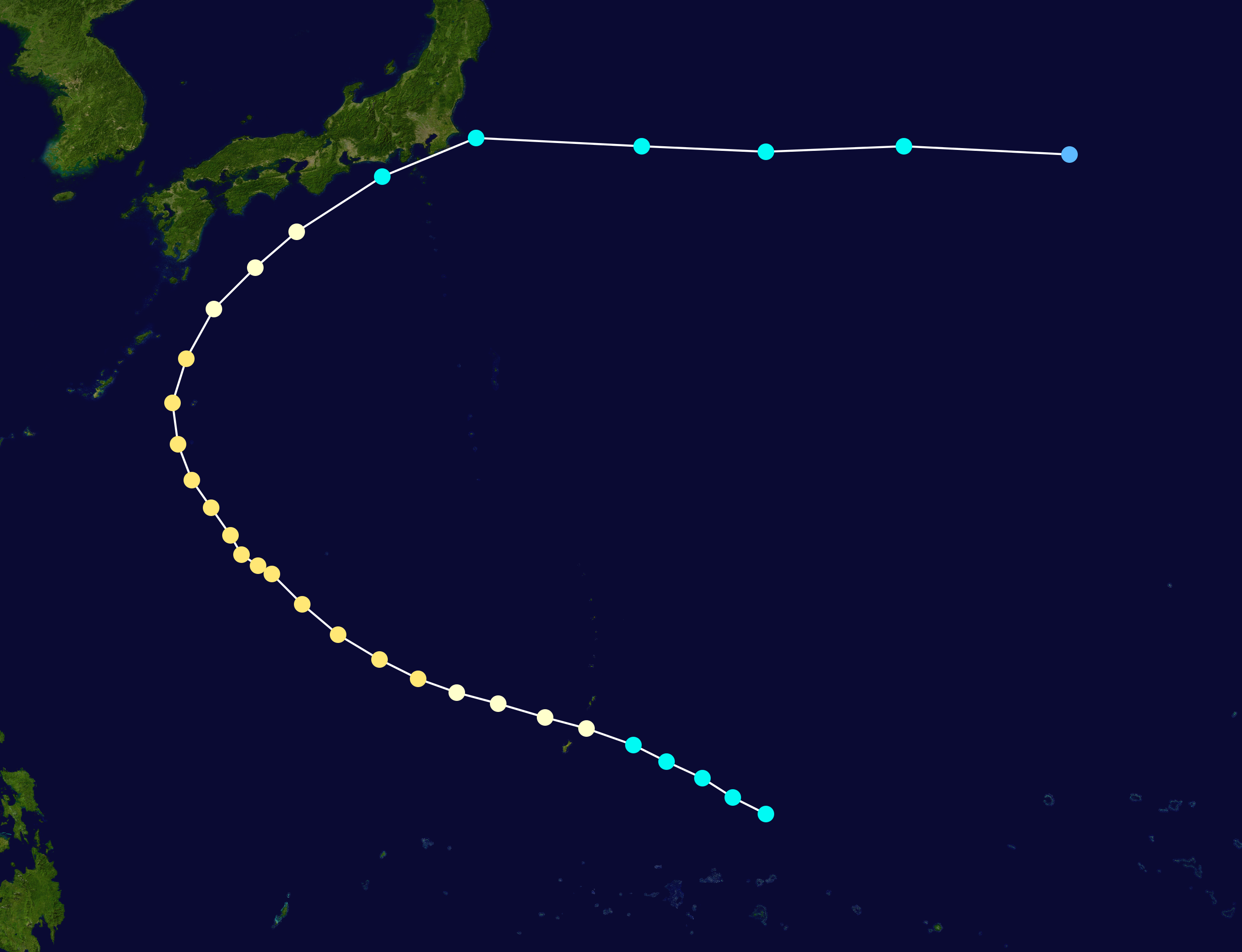
- Duration: November 13 – November 20
- Peak intensity: 175 km/h (110 mph) (1-min); 939 hPa (mbar)

Agnes hit Japan as a tropical storm.

=== Tropical Storm 24W ===
- Tropical storm (SSHWS)
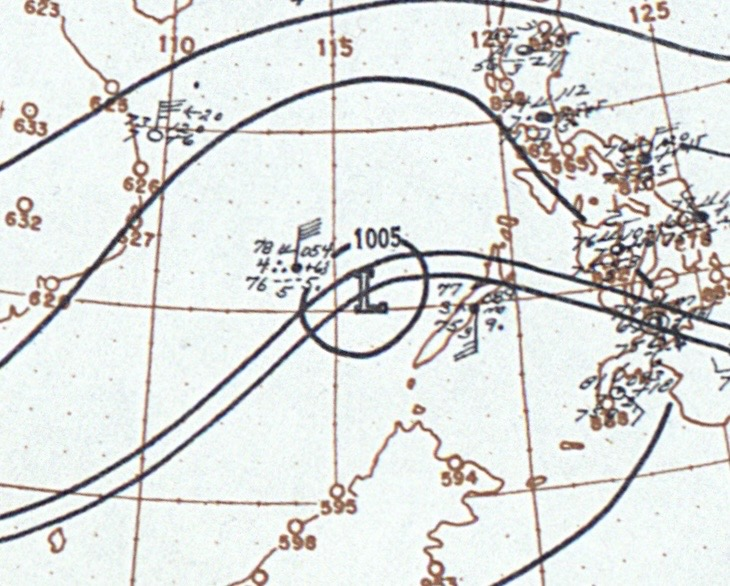
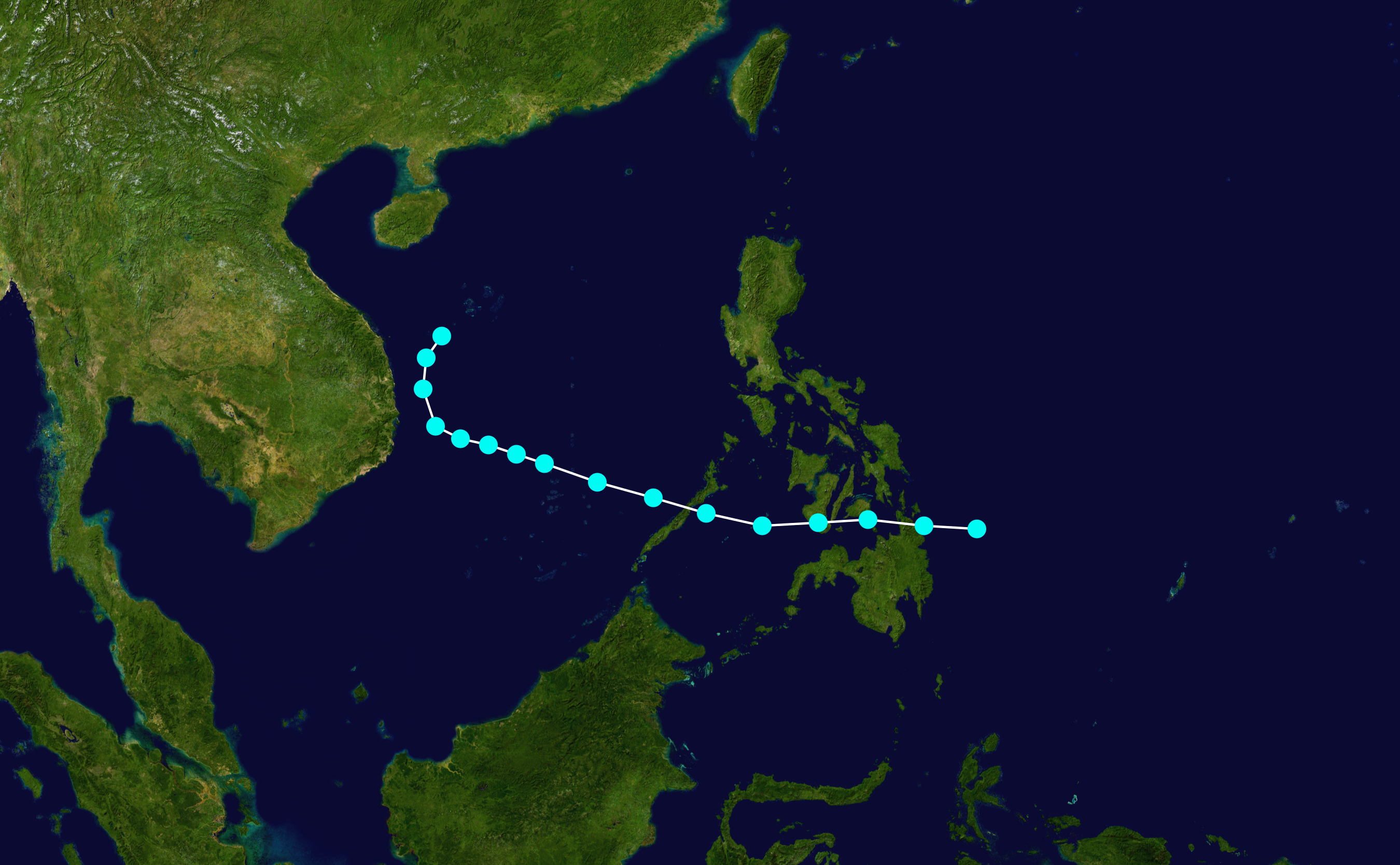
- Duration: November 29 – December 2
- Peak intensity: 85 km/h (50 mph) (1-min); 997 hPa (mbar)

24W hit the Philippines.

=== Typhoon Beverly ===
- Typhoon (JMA)
- Category 1 typhoon (SSHWS)
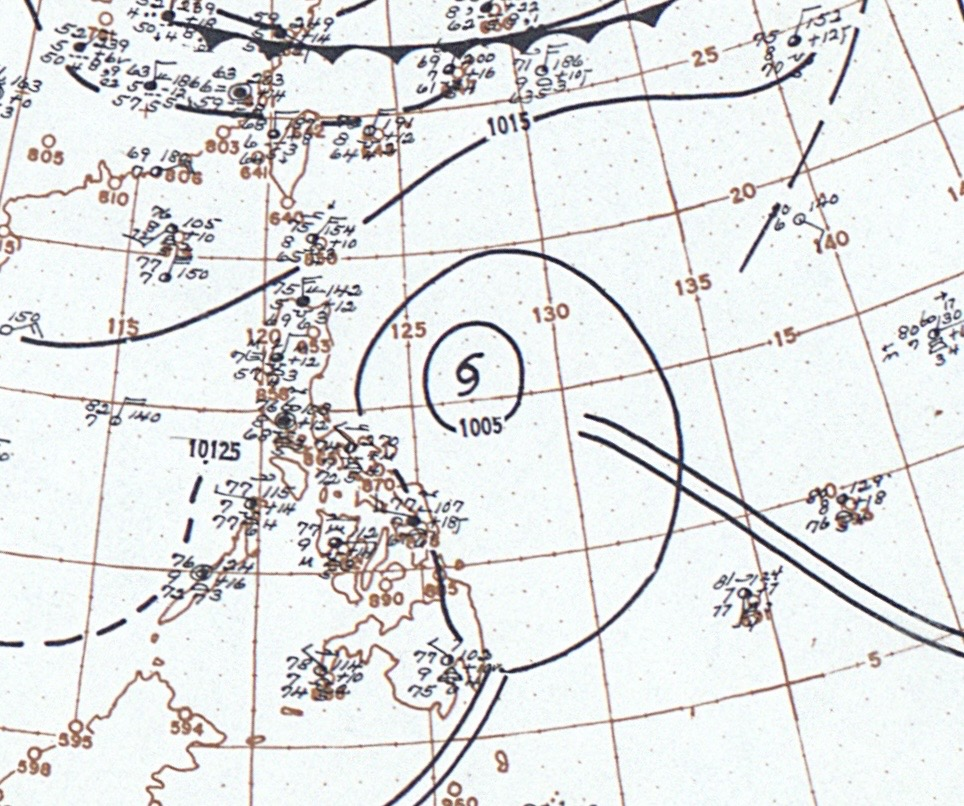
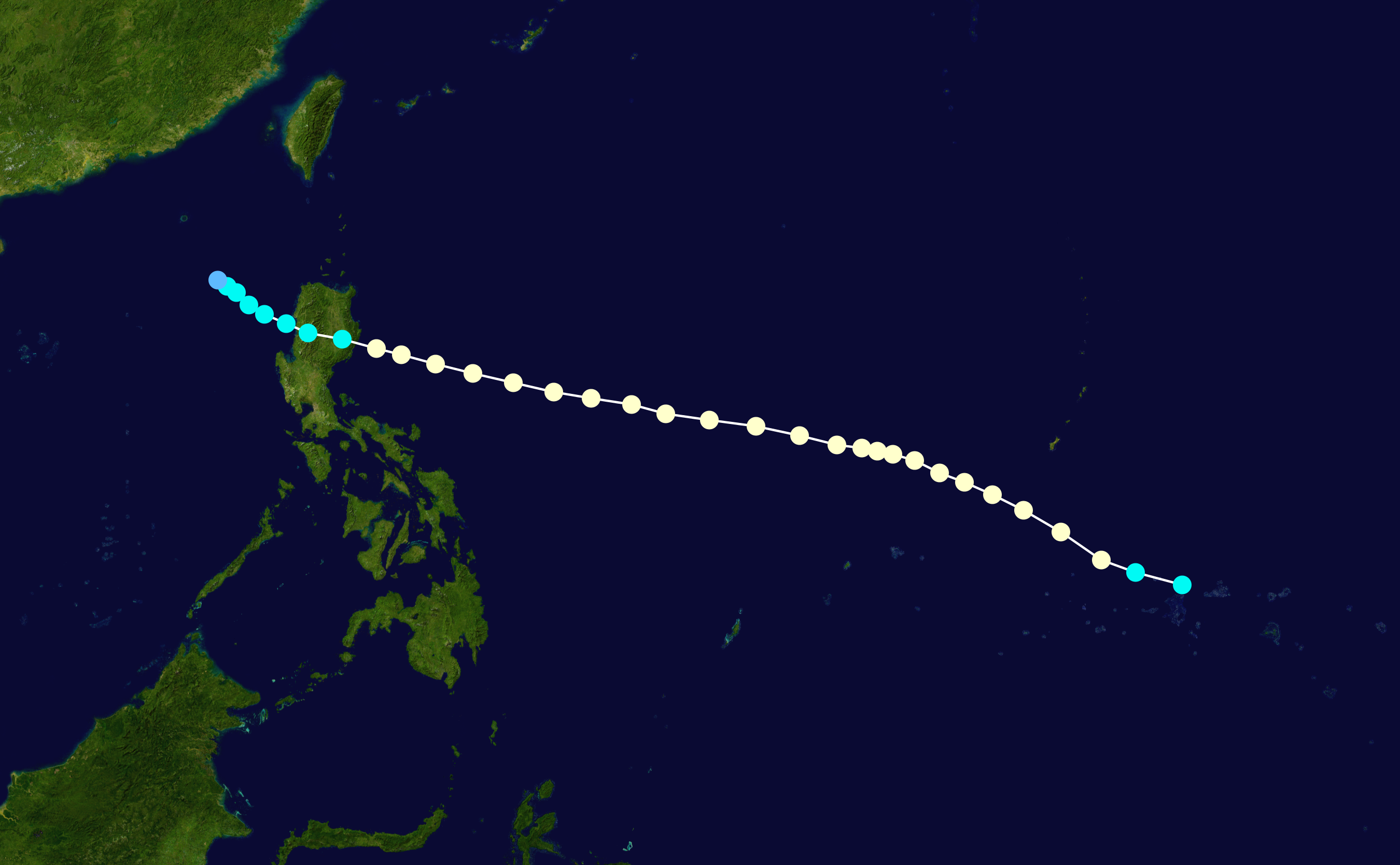
- Duration: December 2 – December 10
- Peak intensity: 150 km/h (90 mph) (1-min); 947 hPa (mbar)

Beverly existed from December 2 to December 10. It hit the Philippines as a tropical storm.

=== Tropical Storm 26W ===
- Tropical storm (SSHWS)
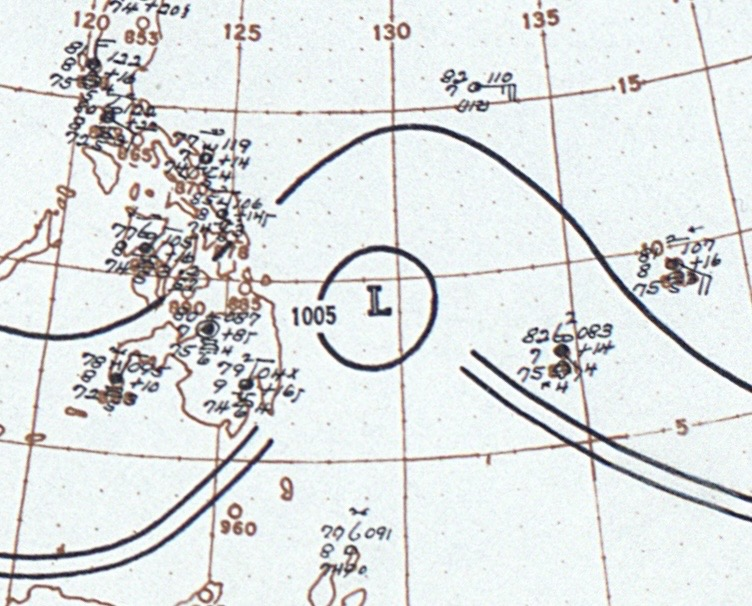
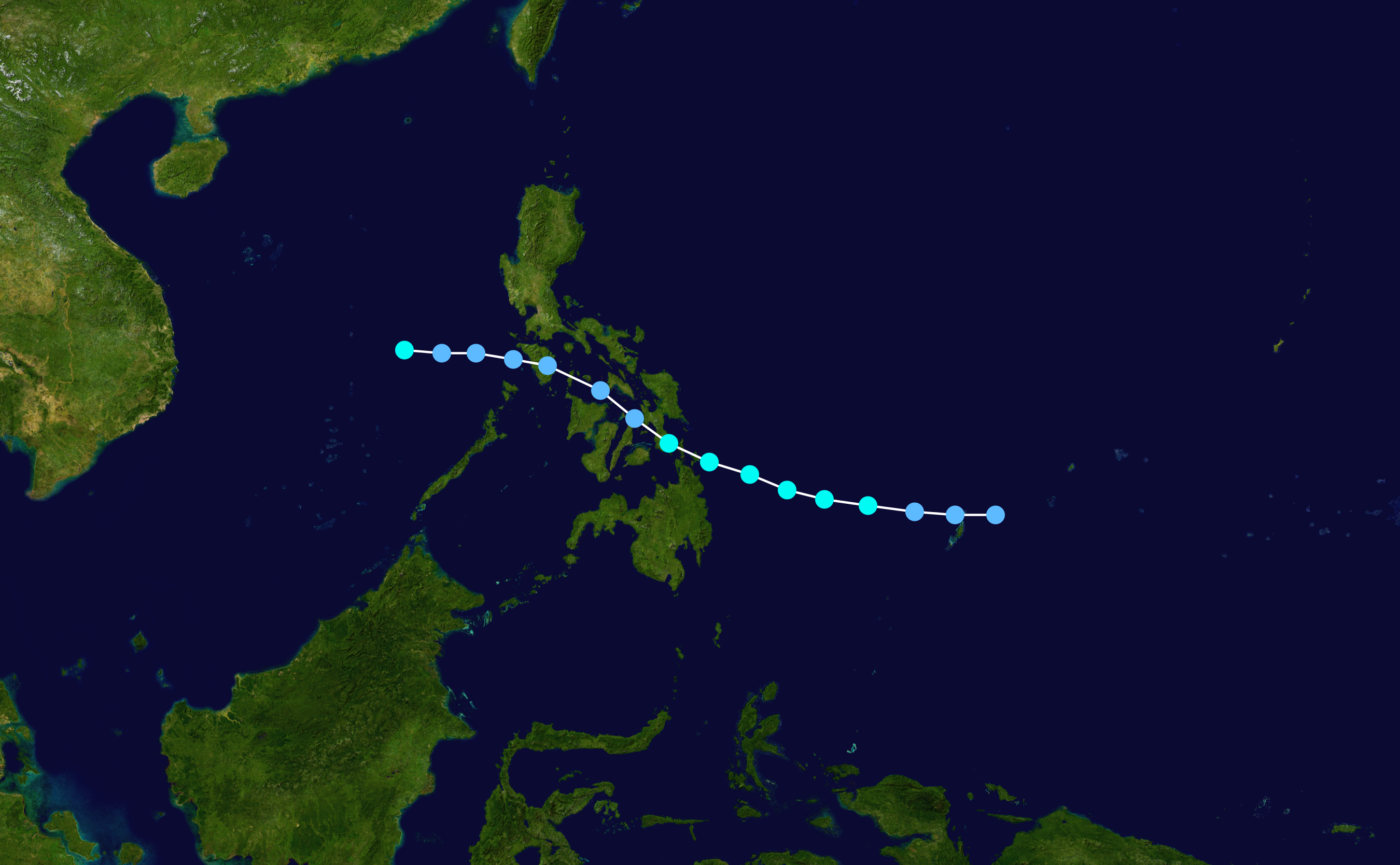
- Duration: December 12 – December 16
- Peak intensity: 75 km/h (45 mph) (1-min); 997 hPa (mbar)

26W made landfall in the Southern Leyte, Philippines and Mindanao.

=== Other system ===
Between July 23 and August 4, the name Annabell was assigned to a North West Pacific system. The Air Weather Service issued a bulletin issued and tropical cyclone named on what was later determined to be "trough activity"

== Storm names ==
Tropical storm names were assigned by the Joint Typhoon Warning Center since 1945.

- Karen
- Lana
- Mabel
- Nadine
- Ophelia
- Pearl
- Rose
- Annabell
- Bertha
- Chris
- Dolores
- Eunice
- Flo
- Gertrude
- Hazel
- Ione
- Jackie
- Kit
- Libby
- Martha
- Norma
- Olga
- Pat
- Rita
- Agnes
- Beverly

== See also ==
- 1948 Atlantic hurricane season
- Pacific typhoon season
- 1900–1950 South-West Indian Ocean cyclone seasons
- 1940s Australian region cyclone seasons
- 1940s South Pacific cyclone seasons
