= 1942–1948 Pacific hurricane seasons =

The 1942–48 Pacific hurricane seasons all began during late spring in the northeast Pacific Ocean and the central Pacific. They ended in late fall.

Before the satellite age started in the 1960s, data on east Pacific hurricanes is extremely unreliable. In a few years, there are no reported cyclones although many systems certainly formed.

== 1942 season ==
There are no known tropical cyclones.

== 1943 season ==
A disturbance developed between the Revillagigedo Islands and the Marias Islands on October 8. It moved rapidly northeastward where it rapidly intensified, reaching pressures as low as 95.86 kPa (28.31 inHg). On October 9, as a major hurricane it struck the west coast of Mexico, a short distance south of Mazatlán. The next day, the hurricane dissipated inland.

This hurricane caused damage in and around Mazatlán. It sank several vessels. The total cost of damage was $4,500,000 (1943 US dollars), and at least 106 people were killed.

== 1944 season ==
There are no known tropical cyclones.

== 1945 season ==
A hurricane dissipated off the northern coast of the Baja California Peninsula. Its remnants moved northeast, and they brought rain to California on September 9 and 10.

A tropical depression, a continuation of Atlantic Hurricane 10, entered the Pacific Ocean on October 5. A circulation center associated with this cyclone moved along the Mexican coast, and remained recognizable until it was west of Acapulco. It caused heavy rain along its path.

== 1946 season ==
A hurricane made landfall on the northern Baja California Peninsula. It dissipated over northern Baja California. Its remnants headed north, where they brought rain to the mountains of southern and central California on September 30 and October 1.

== 1947 season ==
There are no known tropical cyclones.

== 1948 season ==
In mid-October, a hurricane moved into the Gulf of California; a ship was reported missing for 2 days.

== See also ==
- List of Pacific hurricanes
- Pacific hurricane season
- 1940s North Indian Ocean cyclone seasons
- 1900–1950 South-West Indian Ocean cyclone seasons
- 1940s Australian region cyclone seasons
- 1940s South Pacific cyclone seasons
- Atlantic hurricane seasons: 1940, 1941, 1942, 1943, 1944, 1945, 1946, 1947, 1948, 1949
- Western Pacific typhoon seasons: 1940, 1941, 1942, 1943, 1944, 1945, 1946, 1947, 1948, 1949
