= 1940s South Pacific cyclone seasons =

Seasonal boundaries
- First system formed: February 4, 1940
- Last system dissipated: December 21, 1949

Seasonal statistics
- Total disturbances: 71
- Total fatalities: 500+
- Total damage: Unknown

Related article
- 1940s Australian region cyclone seasons

The following is a list of all reported tropical cyclones within the South Pacific Ocean to the east of 160°E after the start of World War II in September 1939 and before the start of the 1950s decade.

== Background ==
During the decade, meteorology in the Pacific rapidly developed after Britain, France and their dependent territories including Australia, Fiji, New Caledonia and New Zealand, declared war on Germany during September 1939. In particular, the New Zealand's Meteorological Service also took control of the Apia Observatory and created a facility at Lacuala Bay in Suva, Fiji during 1940. Meteorological operations were also started at the Nadi Airport by the United States Army Air Forces Meteorological Unit during 1942.

During 1946, the Nadi military establishment was converted to a civilian unit, before the forecasting unit at Lacuala Bay was merged with the Nadi weather office during the following year. At this time, the Nadi Weather Office (NWO) primarily provided meteorological services for aviation as a branch of the NZMS. However, over the next few years, the NWO gradually expanded its services to the non-aviation sector, providing daily weather forecasts and tropical cyclone warnings for most Pacific island countries and some territories, and international marine services for a large part of the tropical South Pacific Ocean.

During the decade, tropical cyclones would have been impacted by the El Niño events of 1940–41, 1941–42 and 1946–47 as well as the La Niña events of 1942–43 and 1949–51.

== Systems ==
=== 1939–1940 ===
- February 4 – 18, 1940 – A tropical cyclone developed to the west of Tuvalu and moved south-westwards through central Vanuatu during February 8. The system subsequently passed to the north of New Caledonia and moved north-westwards into the Australian region, before it made landfall near Cardwell, Queensland during February 18. Within Vanuatu, several small islands to the north of Efate bore the brunt of the cyclone, with most of the citrus, breadfruit and coconut trees on these islands uprooted, while ten missionary churches and several houses were destroyed. Within Queensland, flooding caused a lot of damage to crops and infrastructure in the region between Innisfail and Townsville.
- February 6 – 8, 1940 – A tropical cyclone probably developed in the vicinity of French Polynesia's Leeward Islands, before it moved south-eastwards and passed to the south of Tahiti and north of the Austral Islands during February 7. In association with this cyclone, gale-force winds were experienced at Uturoa and Makatea, while very heavy swells were reported in the port of Pape'ete.
- February 14 – 23, 1940 – A tropical cyclone impacted Vanuatu and New Caledonia.

=== 1940–1941 ===
- December 30, 1940 – January 6, 1941 – A tropical cyclone impacted the Northern Cook Islands.
- December 29 – 31, 1940 – A tropical cyclone existed to the north of Tahiti, where winds of 90 km/h (55 mph) were reported.
- January 13 – 19, 1941 – A tropical cyclone impacted the Northern Cook Islands and French Polynesia.
- February 1 – 7, 1941 – A tropical cyclone impacted Vanuatu's Bank Islands.
- February 16 – 26, 1941 – A tropical cyclone impacted Tonga, Samoa and Fiji.
- February 26 – March 6, 1941 – A tropical cyclone impacted Tokelau, Samoa, Niue and the Southern Cook Islands.
- April 4 – 7, 1941 – A tropical cyclone impacted Vanuatu and New Caledonia.
- April 25 – 28, 1941 – A tropical cyclone impacted Fiji.

=== 1941–1942 ===
- November 24–28, 1941 - A tropical cyclone impacted Samoa and the Southern Cook Islands.
- December 16, 1941 - A tropical cyclone impacted Fiji and Samoa.
- December 25–27, 1941 – A tropical cyclone moved south-eastwards between Vanua Levu and Viti Levu, before it impacted the Southern Lau Islands, Taveuni and southern Tonga.
- February 16–27, 1942 - A tropical cyclone impacted Tuvalu & the Cook Islands.
- February 25 - March 8, 1942 - A tropical cyclone impacted Vanuatu and New Caledonia.
- April 8–13, 1942 - A tropical cyclone impacted New Caledonia.

=== 1942–1943 ===
- December 22, 1942 - January 5, 1943 - A tropical cyclone developed near the Santa Cruz Islands and moved south-eastwards over Vanua Levu, the Lau Islands and Ogea.
- March 4–8, 1943 - A tropical cyclone was located to the northwest of New Caledonia.
- March 7–13, 1943 - A tropical cyclone impacted the Cook Islands.
- March 16–19. 1943 - A tropical cyclone moved south-westwards, through the Lau Islands where it caused minor damage.
- March 28–31, 1943 - A possible tropical cyclone existed to the west of New Caledonia and was moving towards New Zealand.

=== 1943–1944 ===
- December 15–18, 1943 – A tropical cyclone impacted the Cook Islands.
- January 8 – 12, 1944 – A tropical cyclone moved erratically around Southern Fiji before it impacted Tonga.
- January 16 – 20, 1944 – A tropical cyclone impacted New Caledonia.
- January 27 – 31, 1944 – A tropical cyclone impacted Fiji and Samoa.
- January 27 – February 2, 1944 – A tropical cyclone impacted Tuvalu, Niue, Wallis and Futuna, Tonga and the Cook Islands.
- February 3 – 6, 1944 – A tropical cyclone impacted Vanuatu.
- March 15 – 22, 1944 – A tropical cyclone impacted Fiji but caused no damage.

=== 1944–1945 ===
- February 1945 - A minor tropical cyclone developed to the north of Fiji and moved south-eastwards between Tonga's Vavau and Happai islands, where it caused little or no damage.
- March 7–8, 1945 - A tropical cyclone moved into the South Pacific basin from the Australian region.

=== 1945–1946 ===
- January 10–18, 1946 - A tropical cyclone impacted the Southern Cook Islands and French Polynesia.
- January 13–20, 1946 - A tropical cyclone impacted Tonga and Niue.
- January 29–30, 1946 - A tropical cyclone impacted Fiji.
- January 29 – February 8, 1946 - A series of tropical depressions impacted Vanuatu, New Caledonia and Fiji.
- February 24 – March 9, 1946 - A tropical cyclone impacted the Solomon Islands and Queensland.
- March 17–24, 1946 - A tropical cyclone existed to the north of Vanuatu and moved towards Queensland.

=== 1946–1947 ===
- December 24–30, 1946 – A tropical cyclone impacted Wallis and Futuna, Samoa and Niue.
- December 31, 1946 – January 5, 1947 - A tropical cyclone existed in the Coral Sea.
- January 6 – 10, 1947 - A possible tropical cyclone impacted Fiji.
- January 11 – 14, 1947 - A tropical cyclone impacted Vanuatu.
- January 17 – 24, 1947 – A tropical cyclone impacted the Solomon Islands.
- January 28 – 31, 1947 – A tropical cyclon impacted Samoa and Niue.
- February 13, 1947 – A tropical cyclone impacted Vanuatu.
- February 15&–17, 1947 – A tropical cyclone impacted French Polynesia, where it caused some damage in Tahiti.
- February 15 – 22, 1947 – A tropical cyclone impacted Samoa and the Cook Islands.
- February 21 – 25, 1947 – A tropical cyclone impacted Southern Tonga.
- March 9 – 15, 1947 – A tropical cyclone impacted New Caledonia.

=== 1947–1948 ===
- December 13 - 19, 1947 - A tropical cyclone impacted the Fijian dependency of Rotuma.
- December 14 - 17, 1947 - A tropical cyclone impacted Vanuatu and Fiji.
- January 9 - 12, 1948 - A tropical cyclone impacted Fiji.
- January 9 - 11, 1948 - A possible tropical cyclone existed to the east of Vanuatu.
- January 13 - 17, 1948 - A tropical cyclone existed within the Coral Sea.
- January 21 - 30, 1948 - A tropical cyclone impacted Vanuatu and New Caledonia.
- January 21, 1948 - A tropical cyclone impacted Tuvalu.
- January 31 - February 1, 1948 - A tropical cyclone impacted Fiji.
- February 3–4, 1948 – A tropical cyclone impacted Fiji where it caused heavy rain, gale-force winds and a moderate amount of damage over Viti Levu.
- February 20 - 25, 1948 - A possible tropical cyclone impacted Vanuatu and Fiji.
- March 11 - 15, 1948 - A tropical cyclone impacted New Caledonia.
- March 19 - 26, 1948 - A tropical cyclone existed to the south of the Solomon Islands.

=== 1948–1949 ===
- December 5 – 13, 1948 – A tropical cyclone impacted Rotuma, Fiji, Tonga and Niue.
- January 10 – 14, 1949 – A tropical cyclone developed near Queensland and moved south-eastwards through the Coral Sea, before it through New Caledonia's Loyalty Islands and weakened. The system had a minor impact on New Caledonia when it impacted the French Territory between January 13–14.
- January 17 – 24, 1949 – A tropical cyclone developed to the east of the Santa Cruz Islands and moved southwestwards towards Vanuatu. However, the system subsequently recurved south-eastwards
- January 24 – 27, 1949 – A tropical cyclone impacted Vanuatu.
- February 7 – 17, 1949 – A tropical cyclone existed within the Coral Sea.
- February 22 – 23, 1949 – A tropical cyclone developed between Fiji and Rotuma.
- March 13 – 18, 1949 – A tropical cyclone possibly existed to the east of Vanuatu and moved southwestwards over New Caledonia.
- March 25 – 29, 1949 – A tropical cyclone existed within the Coral Sea, to the west and south of New Caledonia.

=== 1949–1950 ===
- December 9 – 13, 1949 – A tropical cyclone developed over the Coral Sea and moved south-southeastwards towards New Caledonia and passed over the French Territory during December 11. During the following day, a ship experienced winds equivalent to force 12 on the Beaufort Scale, about 100 km (60 mi) to the south-southwest of the system's centre. The system had a minor impact on New Caledonia and its Loyalty Islands.
- December 17–21, 1949 – During December 17, a tropical cyclone developed to the north of Fiji and moved south-southeast to the east of the Lau Islands. The system subsequently passed in between Tonga's Haʻapai and Tongatapu group of islands during December 20, before it accelerated southeastwards. Within Tonga, around 20% of the banana crop was heavily damaged, while coconut trees suffered some minor damage and some telephone lines were brought down. Rainfall totals of 167 mm (6.6 in), 163 mm (6.4 in), 82 mm (3.2 in), in Nuku‘alofa, Haʻapai and Vavau respectively. When the system was located near 28S, a ship located within 50 km (30 mi) of the system's centre reported storm force winds and a pressure of 974 hPa (28.76 inHg), however, no gale force winds were reported at Nuku‘alofa.

=== Other systems ===
- 1948 – A tropical cyclone impacted the Solomon Islands, where it removed most of the vegetation on the island of Utupia.
- It is thought that a tropical cyclone impacted Temotu Province in either 1948 or 1949, with Taumako Island stripped of its vegetation.

== See also ==
- South Pacific tropical cyclone
- Atlantic hurricane seasons: 1940, 1941, 1942, 1943, 1944, 1945, 1946, 1947, 1948, 1949
- Eastern Pacific hurricane seasons: 1940, 1941, 1942, 1943, 1944, 1945, 1946, 1947, 1948, 1949
- Western Pacific typhoon seasons: 1940, 1941, 1942, 1943, 1944, 1945, 1946, 1947, 1948, 1949
- North Indian Ocean cyclone seasons: 1940, 1941, 1942, 1943, 1944, 1945, 1946, 1947, 1948, 1949
