= 1940s North Indian Ocean cyclone seasons =

Seasonal boundaries
- First system formed: 1940
- Last system dissipated: 1949

Seasonal statistics
- Depressions: 46
- Total fatalities: 7,500+
- Total damage: Unknown

The years between 1940 and 1949 featured the 1940s North Indian Ocean cyclone seasons. Each season was an ongoing event in the annual cycle of tropical cyclone formation. The North Indian tropical cyclone season has no bounds, but they tend to form between April and December, peaks in May and November. These dates conventionally delimit the period of each year when most tropical cyclones form in the northern Indian Ocean. Below are the most significant cyclones in the time period. Because much of the North Indian coastline is near sea level and prone to flooding, these cyclones can easily kill many with storm surge and flooding. These cyclones are among the deadliest on earth in terms of numbers killed. On 27 April 1949, India Meteorological Department (IMD) became a member of the World Meteorological Organization after independence.

== 1940 season ==
- May 17–25, 1940 – A severe cyclonic storm existed over the Bay of Bengal.
- June 23–27, 1940 – A cyclonic storm existed over the Bay of Bengal.
- June 29 – July 5, 1940 – A severe cyclonic storm existed over the Bay of Bengal.
- July 6–11, 1940 – A severe cyclonic storm existed over the Bay of Bengal.
- August 1–11, 1940 – A cyclonic storm existed over the Bay of Bengal.
- August 11–16, 1940 – A depression existed over the Bay of Bengal.
- August 18–26, 1940 – A depression existed over the Bay of Bengal.
- August 26 – September 1, 1940 – A depression existed over the Bay of Bengal.
- September 14–24, 1940 – A depression existed over the Bay of Bengal.
- September 17–21, 1940 – A depression existed over the Bay of Bengal.
- October 9–20, 1940 – A severe cyclonic storm existed over the Arabian Sea.
- October 19–22, 1940 – A severe cyclonic storm existed over the Bay of Bengal.
- November 3–13, 1940 – A severe cyclonic storm existed over the Arabian Sea.
- November 11–18, 1940 – A depression existed over the Bay of Bengal and the Arabian Sea.
- November 14–24, 1940 – A cyclonic storm existed over the Bay of Bengal.
- December 19–30, 1940 – A depression existed over the Bay of Bengal.

=== November 1940 Mumbai Cyclone ===
In November 1940, a severe cyclone struck Mumbai. Gusts reached 121 km/h in Colaba. There were bodies floating in floodwaters. The cyclone cost the city 25 lakh rupees

== 1941 season ==
- May 21–27, 1941 – A severe cyclonic storm existed in the Bay of Bengal and struck East Bengal (present-day Bangladesh), causing 7,000 deaths.
- May 24 – June 1, 1941 – A severe cyclonic storm existed in the Arabian Sea and the Bay of Bengal.
- June 14–18, 1941 – A depression existed in the Bay of Bengal.
- June 23 – July 8, 1941 – A depression existed in the Bay of Bengal.
- July 6–13, 1941 – A severe cyclonic storm existed in the Bay of Bengal.
- July 8 – August 1, 1941 – A depression existed in the Bay of Bengal.
- August 7–14, 1941 – A cyclonic storm existed in the Bay of Bengal.
- August 15–22, 1941 – A cyclonic storm existed in the Bay of Bengal.
- September 6–13, 1941 – A depression existed in the Bay of Bengal.
- September 12–20, 1941 – A depression existed in the Bay of Bengal.
- October 3–5, 1941 – A depression existed in the Arabian Sea.
- October 4–12, 1941 – A depression existed in the Bay of Bengal.
- November 14–19, 1941 – A depression existed in the Bay of Bengal.
- November 29 – December 6, 1941 – A severe cyclonic storm existed in the Bay of Bengal.
- December 8–15, 1941 – A cyclonic storm existed in the Bay of Bengal.

== 1942 season ==
- February 18–21, 1942 – A deep depression existed over the Gulf of Oman and the Arabian Sea.
- April 24–28, 1942 – A depression existed in the Gulf of Mannar and moved into the Arabian Sea.
- June 3–5, 1942 – A cyclonic storm existed over the Bay of Bengal.
- July 8–13, 1942 – A cyclonic storm existed over the Bay of Bengal.
- July 17–19, 1942 – A land depression existed over the Chota Nagpur Plateau.
- July 23–29, 1942 – A depression existed over the Bay of Bengal.
- July 27–31, 1942 – A depression existed over the Bay of Bengal.
- July 31 – August 6, 1942 – A deep depression existed over the Bay of Bengal.
- August 30 – September 8, 1942 – A depression existed over the Bay of Bengal.
- September 9–12, 1942 – A depression existed over the Bay of Bengal.
- September 19–23, 1942 – A land depression existed over Bengal.
- September 26–30, 1942 – A depression existed over the Bay of Bengal.
- October 11–13, 1942 – A depression existed over the Arabian Sea.
- October 14–18, 1942 – A severe cyclonic storm existed over the Bay of Bengal. It hit near the West Bengal/Odisha border, resulting in around 61,000 fatalities. A wind speed of 225 km/h (140 mph) was recorded.
- November 13–17, 1942 – A severe cyclonic storm existed over the Bay of Bengal.

== 1943 season ==
- May 11 – 23, 1943 – A severe cyclonic storm existed over the Bay of Bengal.
- May 30 – June 3, 1943 – A depression existed over the Bay of Bengal.
- July 9–15, 1943 – A cyclonic storm existed over the Bay of Bengal.
- July 10–13, 1943 – A land depression existed over Central India.
- July 15–21, 1943 – A land depression existed near Calcutta.
- July 24– 31, 1943 – A cyclonic storm existed over the Bay of Bengal.
- July 29 – August 3, 1943 – A depression existed over the Bay of Bengal.
- August 3–10, 1943 – A deep land depression existed near Calcutta.
- August 10–11, 1943 – A land depression existed over Central India.
- August 20–23, 1943 – A depression existed over the Bay of Bengal.
- August 28 – September 4, 1943 – A depression existed over the Bay of Bengal.
- September 19–28, 1943 – A cyclonic storm existed over the Bay of Bengal.
- October 3–14, 1943 – A cyclonic storm existed near Madras.
- October 14–20, 1943 – A cyclonic storm existed over the Bay of Bengal.
- October 27 – November 2, 1943 – A cyclonic storm existed over the Bay of Bengal.
- November 14–18, 1943 – A depression existed over the Arabian Sea.
- November 18–22, 1943 – A depression existed over the Bay of Bengal.

== 1944 season ==
- August 14–19, 1944 – A land depression formed over Jharkhand, moved across India to enter the Arabian near South Gujarat coast. Intensified into cyclonic storm on August 18 before weakening the next day over the Arabian Sea.

=== July 1944 Karachi cyclone ===
On 27 July 1944, a cyclone left some 20,000 people homeless in Karachi.

== 1945 season ==
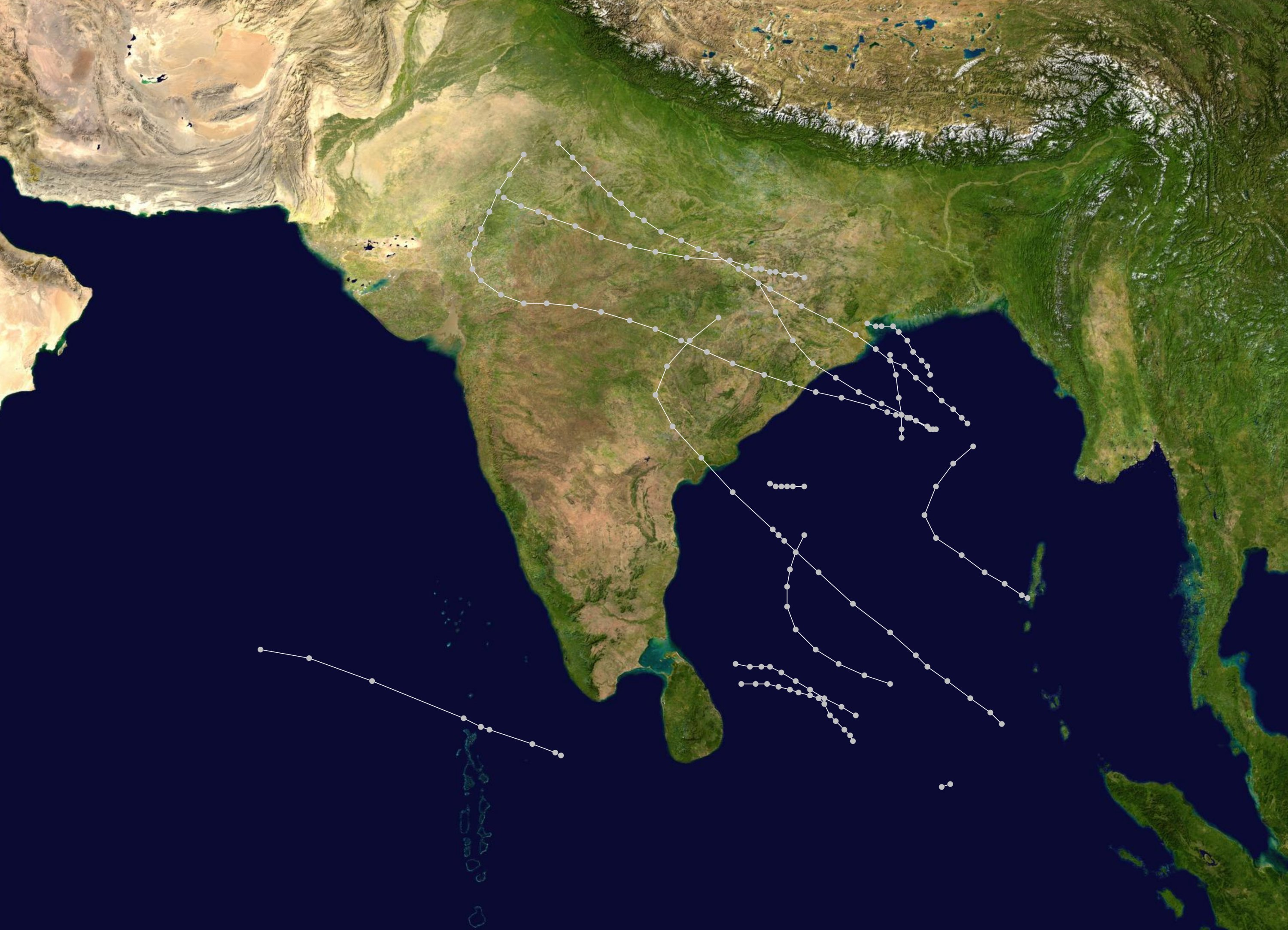
Season summary

== 1946 season ==
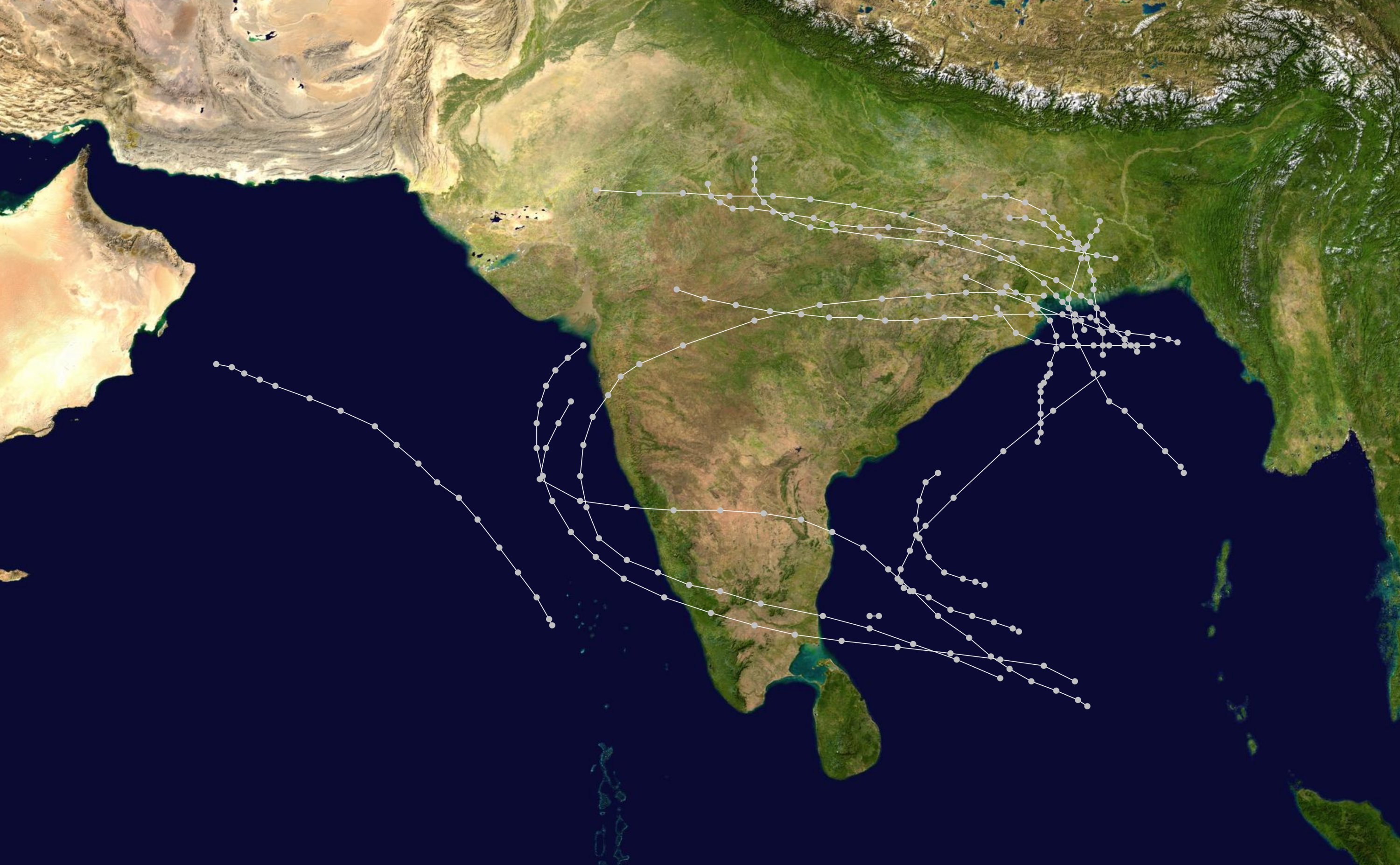
Season summary

=== November 1946 Andhra coast cyclone ===
This significant storm killed 750 people and led to a loss of 30,000 cattle.

=== November 1946 Mumbai cyclones ===
3 Cyclonic storms came in the Vicinity of Mumbai

== 1947 season ==
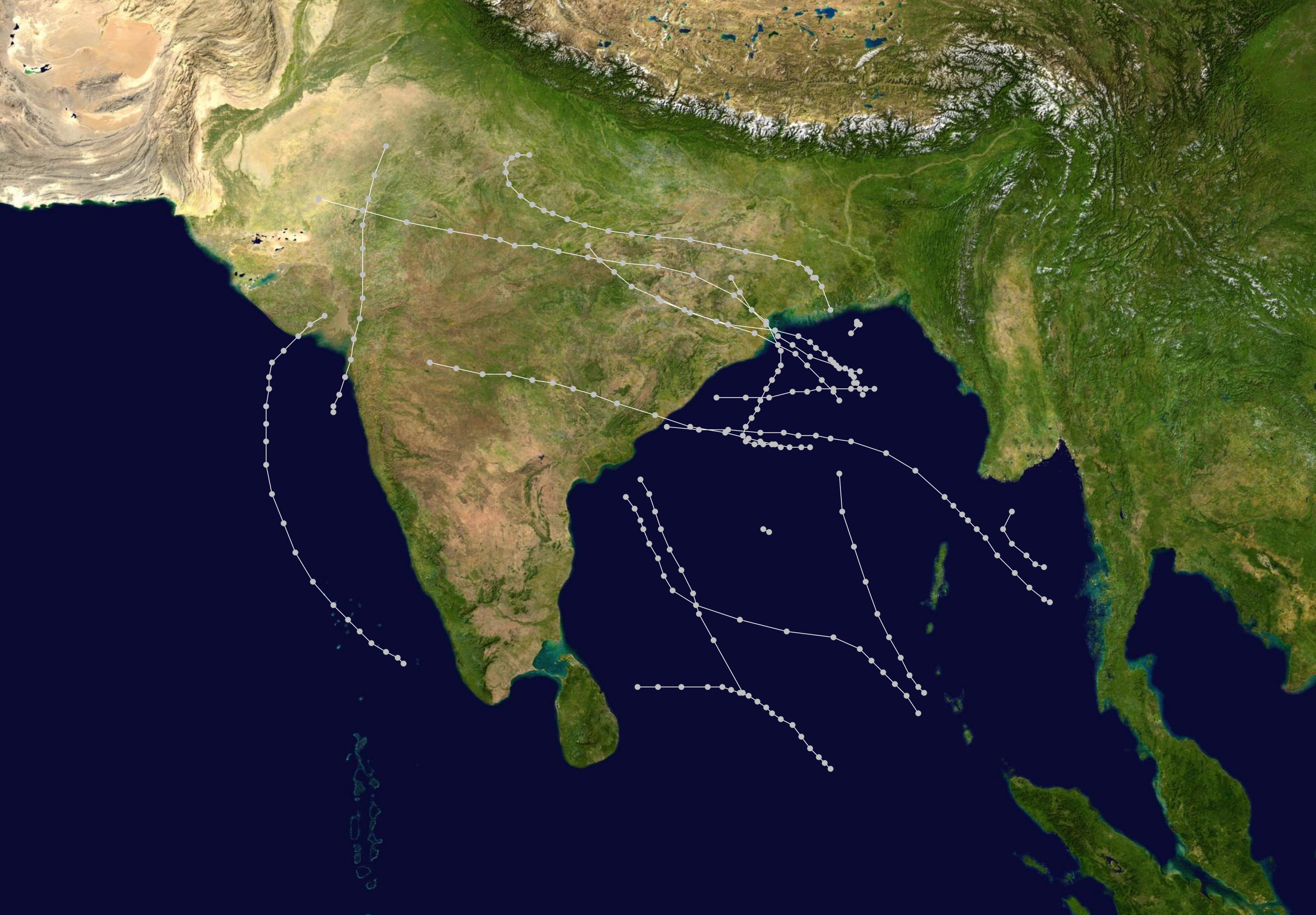
Season summary

== 1948 season ==
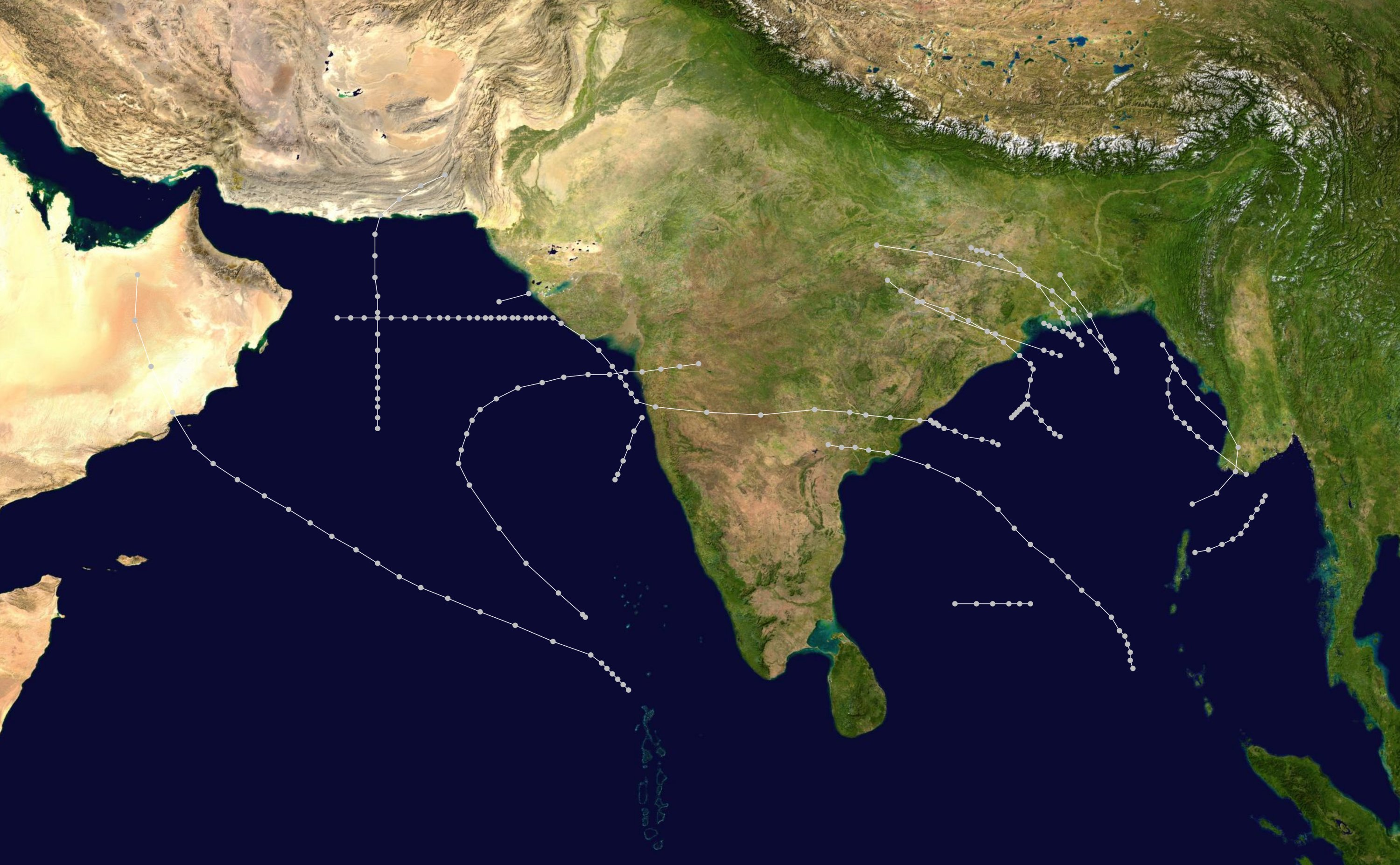
Season summary

=== May 17–19 cyclonic storm ===
A cyclonic storm lasted from May 17–19 before moving ashore current-day Bangladesh between Noakhali and Chittagong, killing 1,200 people and 20,000 cattle.

=== 1948 Balochistan cyclone ===
In 1948, a tropical storm made landfall along the Makran coast in Balochistan province in Pakistan.

=== 1948 Mumbai cyclone ===
On November 21, 1948 a strong cyclone struck Bombay (present-day Mumbai). Gusts in Juhu reached 151 kilometres per hour or 94 miles per hour or 42 metres per second. Torrential rains lashed the metropolis. The storm left 38 people dead and 47 missing Mumbai wouldn't be hit again until 72 years later The city was paralyzed, Trees were uprooted, The city reported 5 inches or 127 millimetres of rain in 24 hours There were floods due to torrential rains and the power supply was disrupted, the Bombay station of All India Radio was also affected, and local transport came to a standstill. The fierce storm reportedly impacted Bombay for 20 hours and put the city in a standstill.

== 1949 season ==
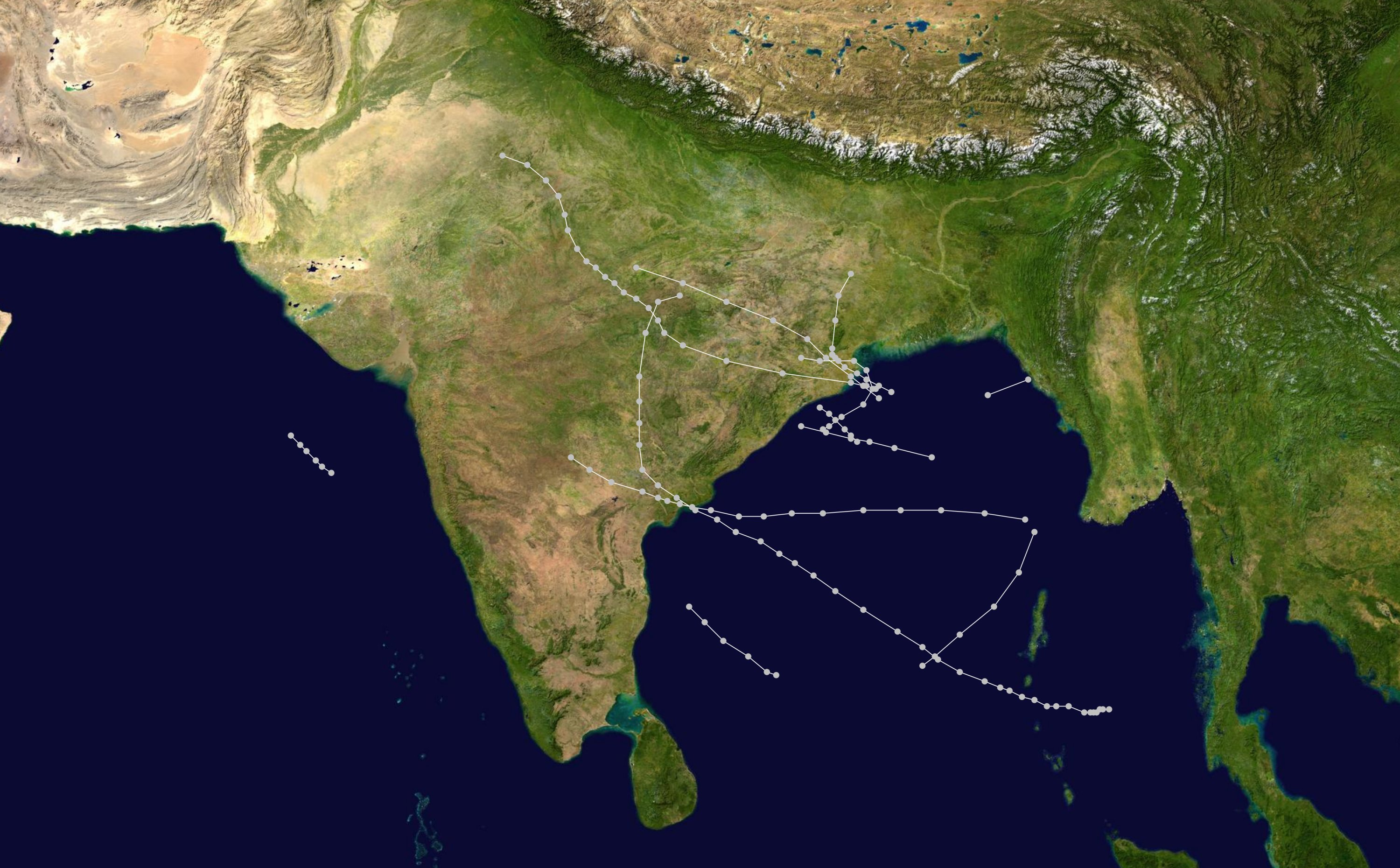
Season summary

=== 1949 Masulipatam cyclone ===
On 28 October 1949, a severe cyclone struck the Andhra coast near Masulipatam. Lowest pressure reported was 976.9 mb and about 800 people lost their lives and thousands were left homeless as a result of the cyclone. Map showing the track of the cyclone was published by the IMD.

== See also ==
- Atlantic hurricane seasons: 1940, 1941, 1942, 1943, 1944, 1945, 1946, 1947, 1948, 1949
- Pacific hurricane seasons: 1940, 1941, 1942–1948, 1949
- Pacific typhoon seasons: 1940, 1941, 1942, 1943, 1944, 1945, 1946, 1947, 1948, 1949
- 1900–1950 South-West Indian Ocean cyclone seasons
- 1940s Australian region cyclone seasons
- 1940s South Pacific cyclone seasons
