= 1942 Pacific typhoon season =

Seasonal boundaries
- First system formed: January 25, 1942
- Last system dissipated: December 17, 1942

Seasonal statistics
- Total storms: 30
- Total fatalities: Unknown
- Total damage: Unknown

Related articles
- 1942 Atlantic hurricane season; 1942–1948 Pacific hurricane seasons; 1940s North Indian Ocean cyclone seasons

The 1942 Pacific typhoon season has no official bounds; it ran year-round in 1942, but most tropical cyclones tend to form in the northwestern Pacific Ocean between June and December. These dates conventionally delimit the period of each year when most tropical cyclones form in the northwestern Pacific Ocean. The scope of this article is limited to the Pacific Ocean, north of the equator and west of the International Date Line. Storms that form east of the date line and north of the equator are called hurricanes; see 1942 Pacific hurricane season.

There were 30 tropical cyclones in the western Pacific in 1942. Nine tropical storms are reported in August, which made it the most active August known at the time.

== Storms ==
=== Tropical Storm One (01W) ===
- Tropical storm (SSHWS)
- Duration: January 25 – January 29
- Peak intensity: 110 km/h (70 mph) (1-min);

The storm didn't really affect that much but it affected the Caroline Islands during late-January 1942.

=== Tropical Storm Two (02W) ===
- Tropical storm (SSHWS)
- Duration: April 8 – April 13
- Peak intensity: 100 km/h (65 mph) (1-min);

This storm is very similar to Tropical Storm One. It has the very same track but it is slightly towards the east and affected the Caroline Islands.

=== Tropical Storm Nine (09W) ===
- Tropical storm (SSHWS)
- Duration: July 28 – July 30
- Peak intensity: 100 km/h (65 mph) (1-min);

A storm formed north of the Philippines on July 28. It impacted Hainan and southern China on July 29–30, as it was dissipating.

=== Tropical Storm Thirty (30W) ===
- Tropical storm (SSHWS)
- Duration: December 13 – December 17
- Peak intensity: 100 km/h (65 mph) (1-min);

The final storm of the season developed on December 13 east of Mindanao, Philippines or in the Philippine Sea. It moved in a fast, northward direction. On the 15th, it moved west, and then west the next day. It finally dissipated early on the December 17, due to vertical windshear.

== See also ==
- Pacific typhoon season
- 1900–1950 South-West Indian Ocean cyclone seasons
- 1940s Australian region cyclone seasons
- 1940s South Pacific cyclone seasons
