= 1940 Pacific hurricane season =

Seasonal boundaries
- First system formed: June 17, 1940
- Last system dissipated: November 3, 1940

Strongest storm
- Name: Three
  - Lowest pressure: 970 mbar (hPa; 28.64 inHg)

Seasonal statistics
- Total storms: 10
- Hurricanes: 2
- Total fatalities: Unknown
- Total damage: Unknown

Related articles
- 1940 Atlantic hurricane season; 1940 Pacific typhoon season; 1940s North Indian Ocean cyclone seasons

The 1940 Pacific hurricane season ran through the summer and fall of 1940. Before the satellite age started in the 1960s, data on east Pacific hurricanes was extremely unreliable. Most east Pacific storms were of no threat to land. During this season, there is a former typhoon that crossed into central north Pacific.

== Systems ==
=== Hurricane One ===
Late on June 17, west-northwest of Acapulco and close to the coast of Mexico, an area of thunderstorms formed into a tropical cyclone. The system was very small, and eventually became a hurricane. It headed west-northwest or northwest, and was last detected early on June 18. A ship in the eye measured a pressure of 97.90 kPa (28.91 inHg).

=== Tropical Storm Two ===
On July 20, a tropical depression was observed southwest of Acapulco. Historical Weather Maps show this depression near 17N 102W. It intensified into a tropical storm on July 21, tracked northwest, and dissipated on July 24. A depression/remnant low was tracked until July 26. The low was last seen near 24N 129W on the 27th. The lowest pressure reported by a ship was 100.66 kPa (29.72 inHg).

=== Tropical Cyclone Three ===
On July 29, a tropical cyclone was noticed. It traveled west-northwest or northwest, and dissipated sometime after July 30. A ship reported a pressure of 96.95 kPa (28.63 inHg).

=== Tropical Cyclone Four ===
South of Acapulco, a tropical cyclone was spotted on August 3. Historical Weather Maps (HWM) show a low on August 2 near 11N 109W. It rapidly tracked to the west-northwest, and was last seen on August 5. The low is carried on HMW until August 9 near 17N 135W. It is possible that this system retained tropical storm-force winds until approximately August 7. A ship reported a pressure of 100.54 kPa (29.69 inHg).

=== Tropical Cyclone Five ===
On September 4, a tropical cyclone was reported. It moved westward, and was lost track of on or after September 5. The lowest reported pressure was 100.31 kPa (29.62 inHg).

=== Hurricane Six ===
A tropical cyclone was detected on September 22. The next day, it had intensified into a hurricane. By September 24, the hurricane was close to the Revillagigedo Islands. After that, no further observations were reported. A ship reported a pressure of 98.34 kPa (29.04 inHg) in association with this hurricane.

=== Tropical Cyclone Seven ===
A tropical cyclone existed well out to sea from October 6 to 11. It traveled northwesterly, and had a lowest recorded pressure of 29.25 inHg (99.1 kPa).

=== Tropical Cyclone Eight ===
Another tropical cyclone existed from October 26 to 28 off the coast of Central America. A ship recorded a pressure reading of 98.27 kPa (29.02 inHg).

=== Tropical Cyclone Nine ===
A tropical cyclone well southwest of Manzanillo was tracked from November 1 to 3. Due to a blocking area of high pressure, it took an unusual southwesterly track. Its lowest recorded pressure was 100.47 kPa (29.67 inHg).

=== Other system ===
Around October 21, a former typhoon that had previously impacted Wake Island crossed into the central north Pacific. It headed eastwards north of Midway Island. It gradually wheeled around to the southwest. It dissipated just east of Midway around October 22.

== See also ==
- 1940 Atlantic hurricane season
- 1940 Pacific typhoon season
- 1940s North Indian Ocean cyclone seasons
- 1900–1950 South-West Indian Ocean cyclone seasons
- 1940s Australian region cyclone seasons
