= 1940 Pacific typhoon season =

Seasonal boundaries
- First system formed: February 1, 1940
- Last system dissipated: December 24, 1940

Strongest storm
- Name: July typhoon
  - Lowest pressure: 927 hPa (mbar)

Seasonal statistics
- Total depressions: 43
- Typhoons: 27 (Record high)
- Total fatalities: 183
- Total damage: Unknown

Related articles
- 1940 Atlantic hurricane season; 1940 Pacific hurricane season; 1940s North Indian Ocean cyclone seasons

The 1940 Pacific typhoon season marked an interruption in meteorological records in both the Philippines and Hong Kong due to the start of World War II. There were 43 reported tropical cyclones, including 27 that attained typhoon status. The first storm was observed in February, and the first typhoon formed two months later, killing three people along Mindanao. Several storms formed in June and July, including reports of a typhoon in the newspapers that killed 52 in South Korea, and another typhoon reported in newspapers that killed one person on Samar after dropping heavy rainfall. The strongest typhoon of the season originated in July and attained a minimum pressure of 927 mbar (27.4 inHg), as reported by a ship northeast of the Philippines.

On August 18, a typhoon moved near or over northeastern Luzon, killing nine people. In early September, a typhoon passed through the Bonin Islands south of Japan and later moved near Kyushu; heavy rainfall caused a reservoir to collapse in Ōita Prefecture, killing 50 people. On September 18, a typhoon caused a tram collision in Tokyo due to poor visibility, killing 20. Another typhoon struck southern Taiwan on September 29, causing 50 fatalities. On October 19, Wake Island recorded typhoon-force winds for the first time since observations began five years prior. A strong typhoon passed near Guam on November 3 with winds of 200 km/h (125 mph), damaging most of the buildings on the island and killing five. Three storms affected the Philippines in December, the second of which was the most notable; it killed 63 people and left 75,000 homeless on Catanduanes. The third of the Philippine storms dissipated on December 24, ending activity for the season. There was another December typhoon that killed two people on a ship to the northeast of Guam.

== Systems ==
Data for most of the storms were provided through the World Wide Consolidated Tropical Cyclone data file known as TD-9636. The document utilized several sources to indicate where storms were located, and as a result there were duplications. During the season, the Philippine Weather Bureau issued monthly bulletins, which later provided info for tropical cyclone tracks. The agency used weather stations that were established by Spain and the United States after each country ruled over the archipelago. The weather data ceased in August 1940, which were later rebuilt in 1945. Also in 1940, meteorology records were disrupted in Hong Kong, which were later restored in 1947, due to World War II.

=== February and April ===
On February 1, a tropical cyclone formed over western Mindanao in the Philippines. It moved northwestward across Palawan island and was last noted later on February 1. Historical weather maps show only a circulation near 9 N 121 E. This was a weak system, likely a depression but may have been a weak Tropical Storm.

Two months later, a tropical depression developed on April 9 to the east of Yap in the western Caroline Islands. It moved west-northwestward, passing south of the island without gaining much intensity. The depression later bypassed Palau to the north, dissipating on April 13 about 400 km (250 mi) west-northwest of the island.

On April 23, a tropical cyclone was observed east of Palau, moving to the west-southwest. It curved south of the island before turning to the west-northwest. While the storm was approaching Mindanao, a ship reported a minimum pressure of 985 mbar (29.09 inHg) and force 12 on the Beaufort scale, indicating that the system was a typhoon. Early on April 26, the typhoon made landfall just south of Port Lamon on eastern Mindanao, where a pressure of 980 mbar (29 inHg) was reported. Along the coast, the storm produced strong winds and heavy rainfall, and killed three people after capsizing a boat. The storm later crossed over Negros island and near Cebu, where winds of 70 km/h (43 mph) were reported. The storm later entered the South China Sea, dissipating near Palawan on April 28.

=== June and July ===
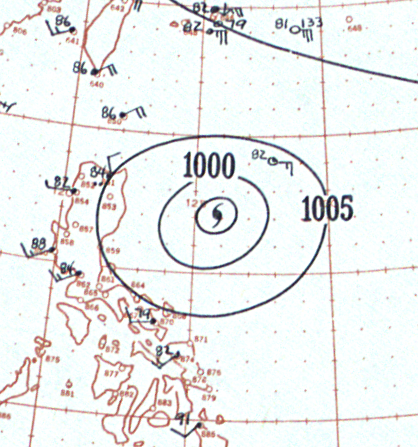
Weather map of the intense typhoon on July 26 northeast of the Philippines

A preexisting low pressure area organized into a tropical cyclone on June 9 near Chuuk State. It moved to the northwest as a tropical depression, influencing the trade winds on Yap. On June 13, the storm executed a small loop to the southwest, later turning back to the northwest. It eventually intensified into a typhoon, producing a pressure of 999 mbar (29.5 inHg) in the Ryukyu Islands while passing to the east. The system was no a longer a tropical cyclone by June 16, either due to dissipation or becoming an extratropical cyclone that continued to the northeast toward Alaska.

Toward the end of June, a tropical depression moved across the Philippines through the Visayas, first observed on June 26. After moving westward into the South China Sea, the depression turned to the northeast, reaching the Luzon Strait. Later, the depression recurved back to the west, dissipating over China on July 3.

On June 29, a tropical cyclone developed southeast of Palau. It moved to the northwest, remaining east of Palau and the Philippines. Later classified as a typhoon, the system turned to the west and struck Taiwan, then known as Formosa, on July 7. It moved across the island, crossed the Taiwan Strait, and dissipated over China on July 9.

Another tropical depression formed on July 4 near Chuuk. It moved generally to the west-northwest, although it curved southwestward on July 6. The next day, the system passed about 480 km (300 mi) south of Guam, by which time it attained typhoon status. It resumed its movement to the northwest, remaining east of the Philippines. On July 11, a nearby ship reported a pressure of 959 mbar (28.3 inHg) and winds of Force 12 on the Beaufort scale. Two days later, the typhoon passed about 95 km (60 mi) west of Naha, Okinawa into the East China Sea, after turning more to the north. On July 14, the typhoon turned to the northeast into the Sea of Japan, moving between Japan and South Korea. It later crossed Hokkaido, dissipating on July 17 in the Sea of Okhotsk.

On July 8, the Australian Associated Press reported that there was a typhoon about 195 km (120 mi) east of Samar. The storm dropped heavy rainfall over a period of a week, the most since 1919 in one area, which caused river flooding and one death. On July 12, local newspapers also reported a typhoon striking Seoul, South Korea, killing 52 people and leaving thousands homeless. However, neither of the two storms were mentioned in the Monthly Weather Review summary for the month.

A short-lived tropical cyclone appeared on July 11 in the South China Sea, but dissipated the next day. Another short-lived system developed on July 13 near Yap, dissipating on the next day. A few days later on July 18, a tropical cyclone formed west of Guam; the system moved westward and was no longer observed by July 23.

On July 12, a tropical depression formed to the east-southeast of Guam. It moved westward, passing through the Marianas Islands on July 14. Around July 18, the storm turned toward the north, passing east of Taiwan. Three days later, the storm approached the Japanese island of Ishigaki 100 km (60 mi) to the west, where a pressure of 985.3 mbar (29.10 inHg) confirmed the system attained typhoon status. On July 23, the typhoon turned to the northeast and moved across the Korean Peninsula. The storm turned to the east, later moving across northern Honshu on July 24, and dissipating two days later.

Another tropical depression formed east of Guam on July 21. It tracked westward, passing near the island on July 23, and later shifted more to the west-northwest. On July 26, a ship reported a low pressure of 927 mbar (27.4 inHg), indicating that the system was a typhoon. The system later passed between the Philippines and Taiwan as it entered the South China Sea, but no land areas reported strong winds, suggesting the typhoon was either very small or had weakened from its peak. On July 29, the typhoon made landfall between Hong Kong and Shantou in southeastern China, quickly dissipating.

On July 24, a tropical depression appeared east of Guam, and soon after passed near the island while tracking northwestward. The system eventually passed between Okinawa and Taiwan, reaching a position 100 km (60 mi) southwest of Naha, Okinawa on July 30; a station on the island reported a pressure of 990 mbar (29 inHg), suggesting the storm attained typhoon status. By the next day, the storm was no longer being tracked in the East China Sea, although the Monthly Weather Review summary indicated that the typhoon continued to the northwest, attaining a pressure of 973 mbar (28.7 inHg). The storm reached a position northeast of Shanghai and dissipated on August 4 after crossing the Shandong Peninsula.

=== August ===
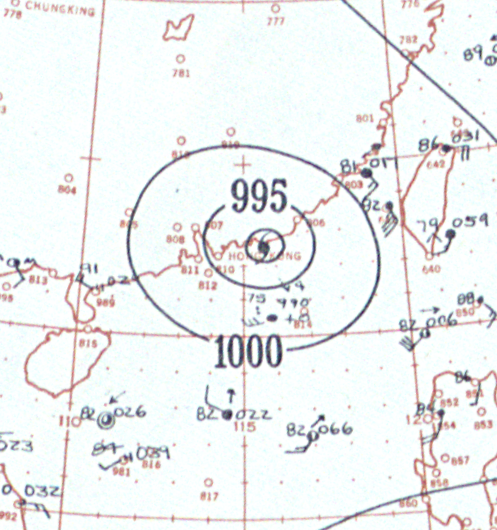
Weather map of the typhoon on August 20 near Hong Kong

Activity in August began when a tropical depression formed on August 1 to the west of Guam. It exhibited a parabolic track, moving west-northwestward before turning to the south, ultimately dissipating on August 4; it never intensified beyond tropical depression status. Another short-lived tropical depression formed on August 1 near Guam, dissipating on August 3 after having moved to the north and west.

On August 11, a tropical cyclone appeared east of Luzon. Over the next few days, it moved across the Philippines, passing near the island of Mindoro on August 13. The system moved across the South China Sea, intensifying into a typhoon as it approached Vietnam. Although it paralleled the coast, the system dissipated over the Gulf of Tonkin on August 17.

A tropical depression formed on August 13 to the southwest of Guam. It gradually strengthened while tracking west-northwestward, becoming a typhoon on August 16. Two days later, the storm passed near or over northeastern Luzon and moved into the South China Sea. After approaching Hong Kong, the typhoon turned to the west-southwest, paralleling the southern China coast. Although the track for the storm ended on August 22, the Monthly Weather Review summary indicated that the typhoon crossed Hainan. The storm then moved across the Gulf of Tonkin and dissipated on August 25 over Vietnam. In Luzon, stations reported a minimum pressure of 975 mbar (28.8 inHg) in Palanan, Isabela. The storm produced widespread flooding in Luzon, which damaged crops and cut communications, and killed nine people. In Ilocos Norte, the typhoon caused a shipwreck, although the passengers and crew were rescued. Later, the typhoon brought gusts of 134 km/h (83 mph) to Hong Kong.

A short-lived tropical depression formed east of Guam on August 14, dissipating a day later. The next tropical system developed about 565 km (350 mi) north of Yap on August 19. It moved generally to the northwest, interrupted a brief turn to the northeast before resuming its trajectory. It quickly intensified into a typhoon, and Naha, Okinawa reported a pressure of 987 mbar (29.1 inHg) on August 23. After passing near the island, the typhoon turned sharply to the northeast. It moved along the southern coast of Japan before coming ashore west of Tokyo on August 26. Soon after, the storm reached open waters and later passed over eastern Hokkaido, dissipating on August 28.

On August 21, a tropical depression formed near Yap. After moving erratically to the south and northwest, the system dissipated on August 25 to the east of the Philippines. There was another short-lived depression on August 28 to the east of Guam, dissipating a day later.

Another tropical depression formed on August 24 to the east-southeast of Guam. After passing south of the island, the system maintained a steady west-northwest trajectory and quickly intensified into a typhoon. On August 29, the storm passed east of the Batanes islands that are between Taiwan and Luzon; a station there recorded a pressure of 987 mbar (29.1 inHg). A day later, the typhoon made landfall in northern Taiwan, and after crossing the island, moved ashore in southeastern China near Fuzhou with a pressure of 979 mbar (28.9 inHg). The storm remained distinct over land, turning to the northeast and passing west of Shanghai. On September 3, the system dissipated off the south coast of South Korea.

The last storm to form in August developed on August 30 to the northwest of Guam. It briefly moved to the north-northeast before maintaining a steady northwest track. The system attained typhoon status, later dissipating on September 4 near Okinawa.

=== September ===
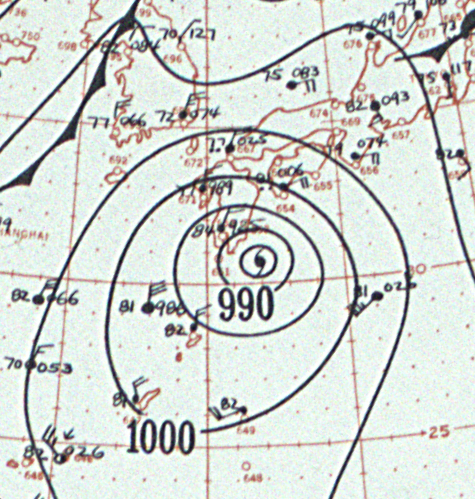
Weather map for the typhoon on September 10 near Japan

On September 2, a tropical depression developed to the east of Guam. The system moved northwestward, remaining east and north of the Marianas Islands. Around September 6, the system passed through the Bonin Islands to the south of Japan, where a station recorded a pressure of 964 mbar (28.5 inHg); this indicated that the storm attained typhoon status. The storm turned to the west, influenced by a high pressure area over Japan. It is possible the storm executed a loop, or it traversed to the north, before resuming a westerly track on September 9. The typhoon later passed over southern Kyushu, later turning abruptly to the northeast and east. On September 12, the system dissipated over central Honshu. While moving through the Bonin Islands, the typhoon destroyed schools, government offices, and power plants. Several people were killed, and 500 were left homeless. Later, the storm disrupted shipping in and around Kyushu, damaging the port at Nagasaki. In Ōita Prefecture, rains from the typhoon caused a reservoir on Kyushu to collapse, killing 50 people.

Also on September 2, a tropical depression formed between Guam and Luzon. It moved to the northwest, then turned to the northeast, intensifying into a typhoon; this was based on a pressure reading of 993 mbar (29.3 inHg) from a nearby ship. On September 6, the system dissipated.

A short-lived tropical depression formed on September 3 in the South China Sea, dissipating the next day while moving eastward. There was another short-lived tropical depression that developed on September 4 near the Marianas Islands, but dissipated within one day. Another tropical depression formed on September 4 to the west of the Marianas Islands, which moved to the south and later northeast, dissipating on September 6. On September 10, a tropical depression formed northeast of Luzon, lasting only two days while moving in a circular track.

On September 9, a tropical depression formed near Chuuk. Two days later, the system passed south of Guam while maintaining a general west trajectory, although it later turned to the north-northwest. By September 13, the system attained typhoon status. Three days later, the storm's track shifted to the north-northeast, bringing it near Hachijō-jima on September 18 which recorded a pressure of 983 mbar (29.0 inHg). That day, it approached southeastern Honshu but remained offshore. After accelerating to the northeast, the system was no longer observed on September 20 to the southeast of the Kamchatka Peninsula. While passing east of Japan, the typhoon caused a tram collision due to poor visibility, killing 20 people.

On September 22, a well-developed typhoon was first observed east-southeast of Guam. The storm moved to the west and later west-northwest, bypassing the island to the south. On September 29, the system entered the Balintang Channel between Taiwan and Luzon, where a station recorded a pressure of 965 mbar (28.5 inHg) at Basco, Batanes. That day, the typhoon passed over or very near southern Taiwan as it continued to the northwest. On September 30, it made landfall about 160 km (100 mi) northeast of Xiamen, weakening over land. The storm turned to the north and northeast, reaching the East China Sea and dissipating on October 2. In Taiwan, the typhoon killed 50 people and wrecked 5,000 houses.

The final September storm originated east of Guam on September 29. It moved westward, intensifying into a typhoon and passing north of Guam. After varying its track toward the north or south, the typhoon dissipated on October 5.

=== October ===
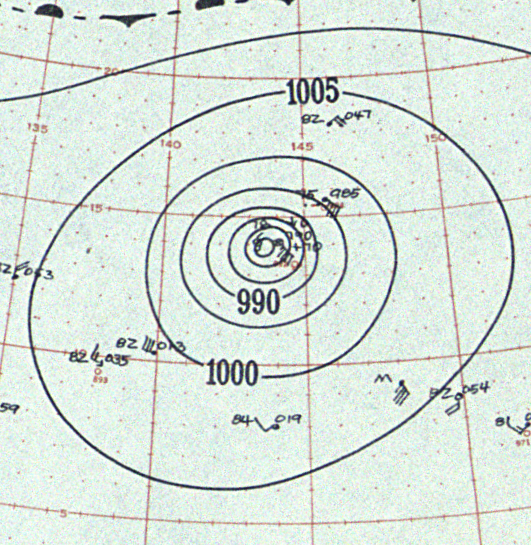
Weather map of the November 3 typhoon near Guam

On October 8, a tropical depression formed west of Luzon. Its track shifted from the northwest to the southwest and later back to the northwest. On October 12, the system passed through the Paracel Islands, where a pressure of 996 mbar (29.4 inHg) was recorded. The storm attained typhoon status, moving ashore in Vietnam on October 15. The tropical cyclone database listed a separate tropical cyclone that lasted from October 11 to 15 in the South China Sea that also struck Vietnam.

A typhoon was observed on October 13 to the northeast of Guam, with nearby ships reporting a pressure of 985 mbar (29.1 inHg). After moving to the northwest, the system turned to the northeast and was no longer observed after October 17.

On October 19, a typhoon passed near Wake Island, where a pressure of 968 mbar (28.6 inHg) was recorded. Winds reached 220 km/h (140 mph), which was the first instance of typhoon-force winds on the island since observations began in 1935. The winds were strong enough to cut radio communications and damage the Pan American World Airways base. The only people on the island were two dozen Pan American workers, who survived by staying in a storm shelter that previously never experienced gale-force winds. After striking the island, the typhoon turned to the northeast, crossing the International Date Line on October 21.

A tropical depression formed on October 29 near Pohnpei. It moved to the northeast initially, but on October 31 began tracking to the west. On November 3, the system passed just south of Guam as a typhoon, where a pressure of 956 mbar (28.2 inHg) was recorded. Winds reached over 200 km/h (125 mph), and there was a slight decrease during the passage of the eyewall. The typhoon turned to the northwest, passing near the Bonin Islands. On November 8, the typhoon accelerated to the northeast, crossing the International Date Line on November 10. When the storm struck Guam, it damaged nearly every building on the island. Most of the damage occurred after the center of the storm passed and the onslaught of easterly winds began. The Navy Yard at Piti was heavily damaged. At Sumay, the storm damaged Marine Barracks Guam, the Pan American Airways hotel used for China Clipper service passengers, and a hangar. The storm also sank a U.S. Navy yard patrol boat and blew ashore the dredge YM-13. Downed trees killed two or three people, and five people in total died on the island, the others likely due to drowning. After the storm, Naval Governor George McMillin sought aid from the American Red Cross to assist residents in rebuilding. It was considered among the worst typhoons on record in Guam.

=== November and December ===
On November 22, a tropical depression developed near Chuuk and moved westward. It crossed over Palau on November 24, and later turned more to the northwest. The system paralleled the east coast of Mindanao, briefly moving ashore on November 26. It turned to the northeast, dissipating on November 29.

The first in a series of storms to form in December was first observed on December 2 to the east of Samar. The storm moved to the west across the island and through the central Philippines, with a station in Samar reporting a minimum pressure of 979 mbar (28.9 inHg). This indicated the system attained typhoon status. While moving westward, it moved through Panay and later across Palawan before entering the South China Sea. On Panay island, Capiz recorded typhoon-force winds, and throughout the Visayas, the storm damaged roads and bridges, but caused no deaths. The system dissipated on December 6.

On December 3, a tropical depression formed about 485 km (300 mi) east of Yap. Tracking westward, it intensified into a typhoon on December 5 while approaching the Philippines. The system turned to the northwest, moving over eastern Samar and crossing Catanduanes island with a recorded pressure of 992 mbar (29.3 inHg). Subsequently, there is contradictory information on the path; the storm either continued to the northwest, dissipating over northeastern Luzon on December 8, or it turned to the southwest. Capalonga in eastern Luzon reported a pressure of 989 mbar (29.2 inHg) on December 8, and later, a station on Marinduque island reported a pressure of 987 mbar (29.1 inHg). The Monthly Weather Report tracked the storm over the Philippines into the South China Sea, reporting its dissipation on December 13 to the east of Vietnam. Across its path through the Philippines, the typhoon brought heavy rains and strong winds, which downed trees and power lines. On Catanduanes, the storm left about 75,000 people homeless, and killed 60. At Labo, Camarines Norte, ten people died when a tree fell onto a house. Another three people drowned between Polillo Island and Camarines Norte.

A tropical cyclone was observed on December 8 southeast of Guam. It moved northwestward and passed about 160 km (100 mi) north of the island on December 10, where a pressure of 999 mbar (29.5 inHg) was recorded. The typhoon turned to the west and later to the southwest. Around December 14, the system stalled to the east of the Philippines, later drifting to the east. On December 19, the system weakened, although it remained a distinct entity as it recurved back to the south and west. On December 24, the storm dissipated after striking Mindanao.

The final storm of the season was observed on December 18 to the northeast of Guam. It affected a nearby ship on December 20, causing the deaths of two members of the crew in the subsequent day. The typhoon tracked to the northeast, crossing the International Date Line on December 21.

== See also ==
- 1940 Pacific hurricane season
- 1940s North Indian Ocean cyclone seasons
- 1940 Atlantic hurricane season
- 1900–1950 South-West Indian Ocean cyclone seasons
- 1940s Australian region cyclone seasons
- 1940s South Pacific cyclone seasons
