= Hurricane Lisa (2022) =

Category 1 Atlantic hurricane

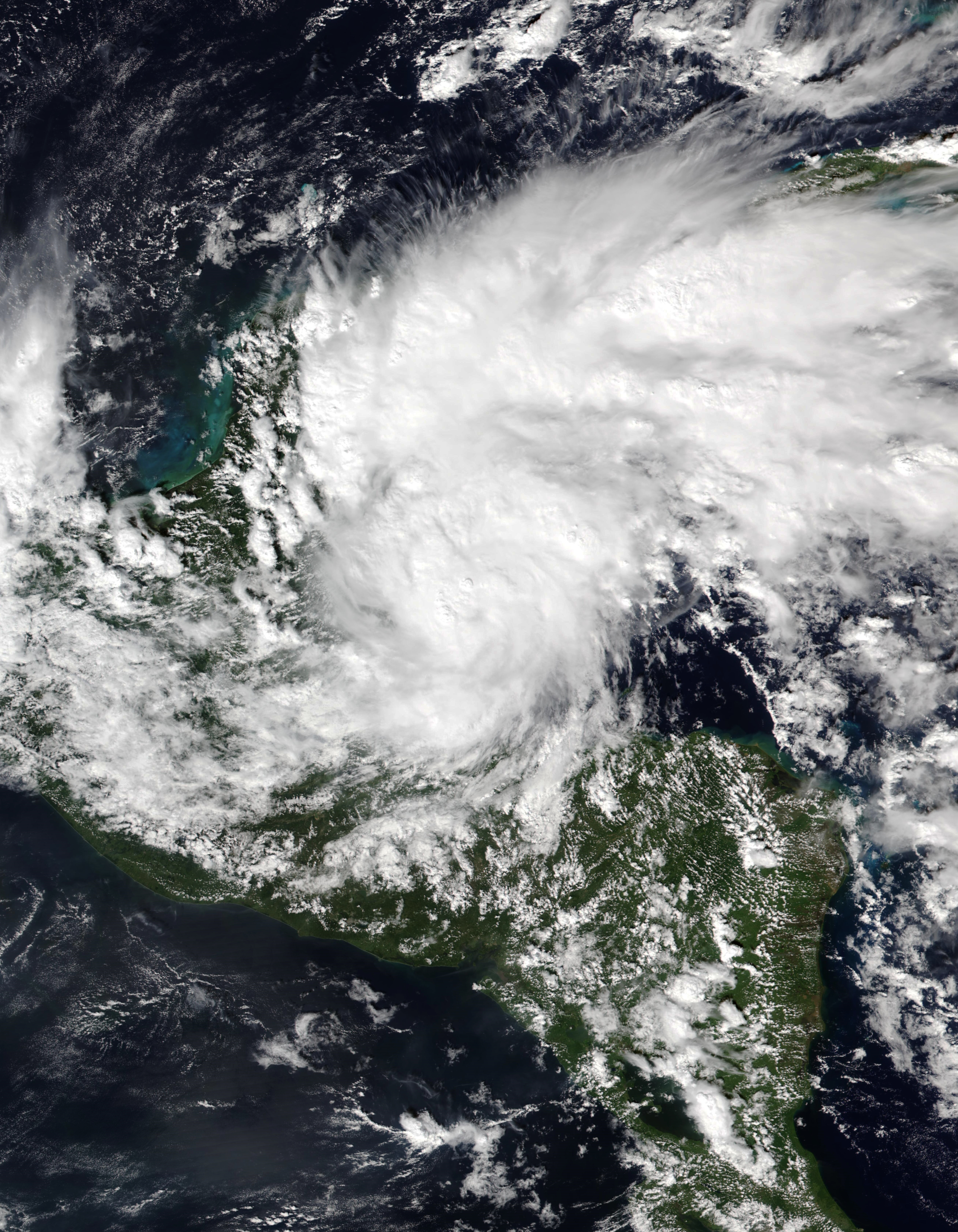
- Hurricane Lisa shortly before making landfall in Belize on November 2

Meteorological history
- Formed: October 31, 2022
- Dissipated: November 5, 2022

Category 1 hurricane
- 1-minute sustained (SSHWS/NWS)
- Highest winds: 90 mph (150 km/h)
- Lowest pressure: 985 mbar (hPa); 29.09 inHg

Overall effects
- Fatalities: None
- Damage: $100 million (2022 USD)
- Areas affected: Jamaica, Grand Cayman, Belize, Guatemala, Honduras, Mexico
- Part of the 2022 Atlantic hurricane season

Hurricane Lisa was a strong tropical cyclone that caused extensive and destructive flooding across Belize and other parts of northern Central America in November 2022. Lisa was the fourteenth tropical cyclone, twelfth named storm and sixth hurricane of the 2022 Atlantic hurricane season. The cyclone developed from a tropical wave that entered the Caribbean Sea on October 25. The wave spawned a broad low-pressure area on October 28, which gradually consolidated into a tropical storm on October 31, and received the name Lisa. Lisa gradually intensified as it continued west-northwestward across the Caribbean, becoming a hurricane on November 2 over the inlet Gulf of Honduras. Lisa achieved peak intensity late that day as a strong Category 1 hurricane with maximum sustained winds of 90 mph (140 km/h) and a minimum barometric pressure of 985 mbar (29.1 inHg), while making landfall near the mouth of the Sibun River in Belize. Lisa quickly deteriorated as it crossed the Yucatán Peninsula, weakening to a tropical storm early on November 3, and further to a tropical depression by 12:00 UTC (Note: All times are in Coordinated Universal Time, unless otherwise noted.) that day. Tropical Depression Lisa emerged over the Bay of Campeche, where it failed to reorganize and opened up into a trough on November 5.

The hurricane caused significant destruction in Belize, severely damaging many homes, schools and businesses, several of which reported complete roof failure. Around 5,000 homes were damaged in Belize, with an additional 500 being completely destroyed. Total damages from the storm in Belize were estimated at US$100 million. (Note: All monetary values are in 2022 USD.) Additional damage from flooding and mudslides were reported in Guatemala and parts of southern Mexico, while lesser effects were felt from the storm in Honduras. Despite the considerable destruction, no deaths were reported from Lisa. Lisa was one of only two November hurricanes to strike Belize on record, along with the unnamed 1942 Belize hurricane.

== Meteorological history ==
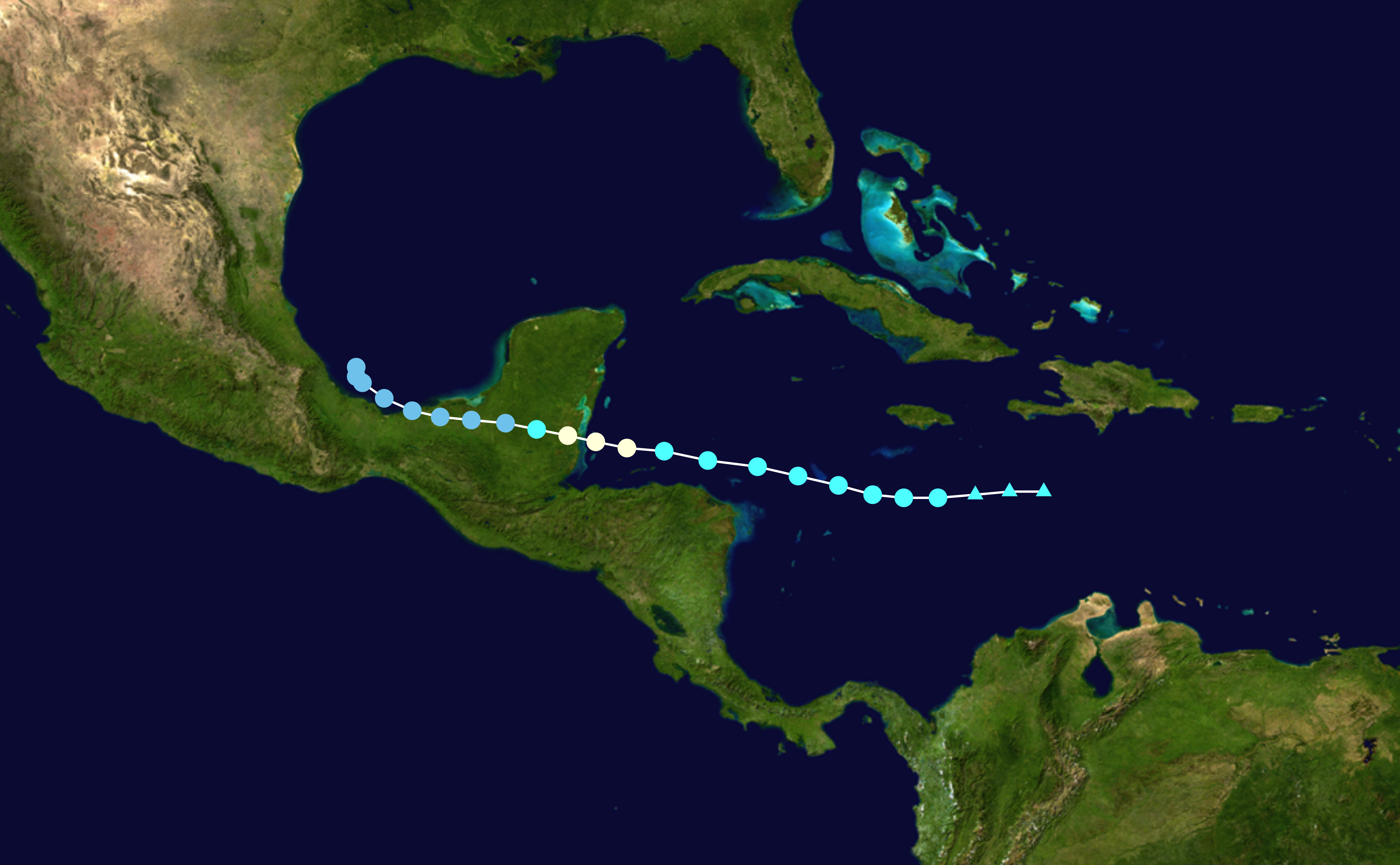
Map plotting the storm's track and intensity, according to the Saffir–Simpson scale Map key Saffir–Simpson scale Tropical depression (≤38 mph, ≤62 km/h) Tropical storm (39–73 mph, 63–118 km/h) Category 1 (74–95 mph, 119–153 km/h) Category 2 (96–110 mph, 154–177 km/h) Category 3 (111–129 mph, 178–208 km/h) Category 4 (130–156 mph, 209–251 km/h) Category 5 (≥157 mph, ≥252 km/h) Unknown Storm type Tropical cyclone Subtropical cyclone Extratropical cyclone, remnant low, tropical disturbance, or monsoon depression

A low-latitude, westward-moving tropical wave left the west coast of Africa on October 17, 2022. The system featured sporadic thunderstorm activity, but westerly wind shear prevented development over the tropical Atlantic. The wave crossed the Lesser Antilles into the Caribbean Sea on October 25 while gradually slowing down. The system interacted with a large mid-level trough as the latter moved eastward across the central Caribbean, spawning a broad area of low pressure on October 28. Dry air left behind by the trough, coupled with continued westerly wind shear, initially prevented development of the low-pressure area as it continued slowly westward. However, it gradually became better organized as conditions became more favorable for tropical cyclogenesis on October 30. Although the system had not yet become organized enough to be declared a tropical cyclone, due to its impending threat to bring tropical storm conditions to Jamaica and Grand Cayman, advisories were initiated on the system as Potential Tropical Cyclone Fifteen at 21:00 UTC that day by the United States–based National Hurricane Center (NHC). More concentrated convection developed over the disturbance's center the following day, leading to the formation of a well-defined surface circulation. Thus, the system became a tropical storm around 12:00 UTC October 31 about 150 nautical miles, or 173 mi (278 km), south of Kingston, Jamaica, as it was already producing gale-force winds; accordingly, it was named Lisa by the NHC. (Note: The NHC operationally did not name the system until 15:00 UTC.)

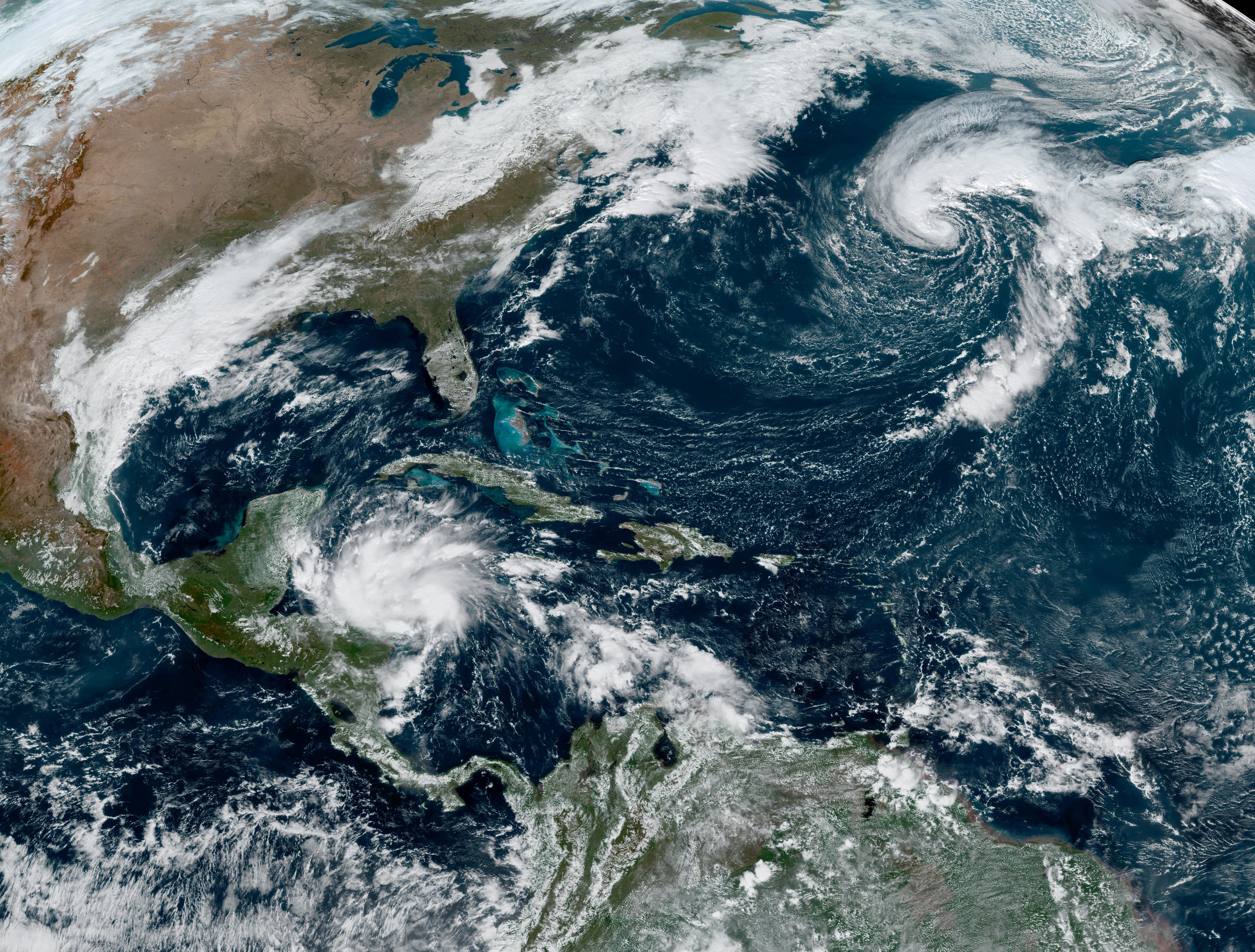
Hurricane Lisa approaching Belize and Tropical Storm Martin over the northern Atlantic on November 1, 2022. This marked only the third recorded instance of two simultaneously active Atlantic hurricanes in the month of November.

Lisa initially intensified slowly due to continued westerly wind shear, as well as dry-air intrusions into its newly-formed circulation. The storm turned west-northwestward under the influence of a ridge to its north. However, reduced shear and dry-air intrusions allowed the small cyclone to begin to steadily intensify on November 1, acquiring a more symmetric appearance and expanding outflow. Entering the Gulf of Honduras in the northwestern Caribbean, Lisa strengthened to a hurricane by 12:00 UTC November 2. Lisa developed an eye that afternoon as it neared the coast of Belize, and the hurricane made landfall about 11.5 mi (18.5 km) southwest of Belize City around 21:30 UTC that day. Lisa concurrently reached its peak intensity, with maximum sustained winds of 90 mph (140 km/h) and a minimum barometric pressure of 985 mbar (29.1 inHg), a strong Category 1 hurricane.

Lisa quickly weakened as it moved inland over northern Central America; however, a portion of its circulation always remained over water during its nearly 36-hour passage over land, allowing the system to maintain its status as a tropical cyclone. Lisa weakened to a tropical storm early on November 3 and further to a tropical depression by 12:00 UTC that day. Lisa emerged over the southwestern Gulf of Mexico, in the Bay of Campeche, just after 6:00 UTC November 4. Despite being back over water, Lisa continued to weaken due to increasing southwesterly shear and entrainment of dry air into its circulation, as it slowed down and turned to the north. The weak depression degenerated to a trough of low pressure by 12:00 UTC November 5, about 100 mi (160 km) northeast of the city of Veracruz.

== Preparations, impact and aftermath ==
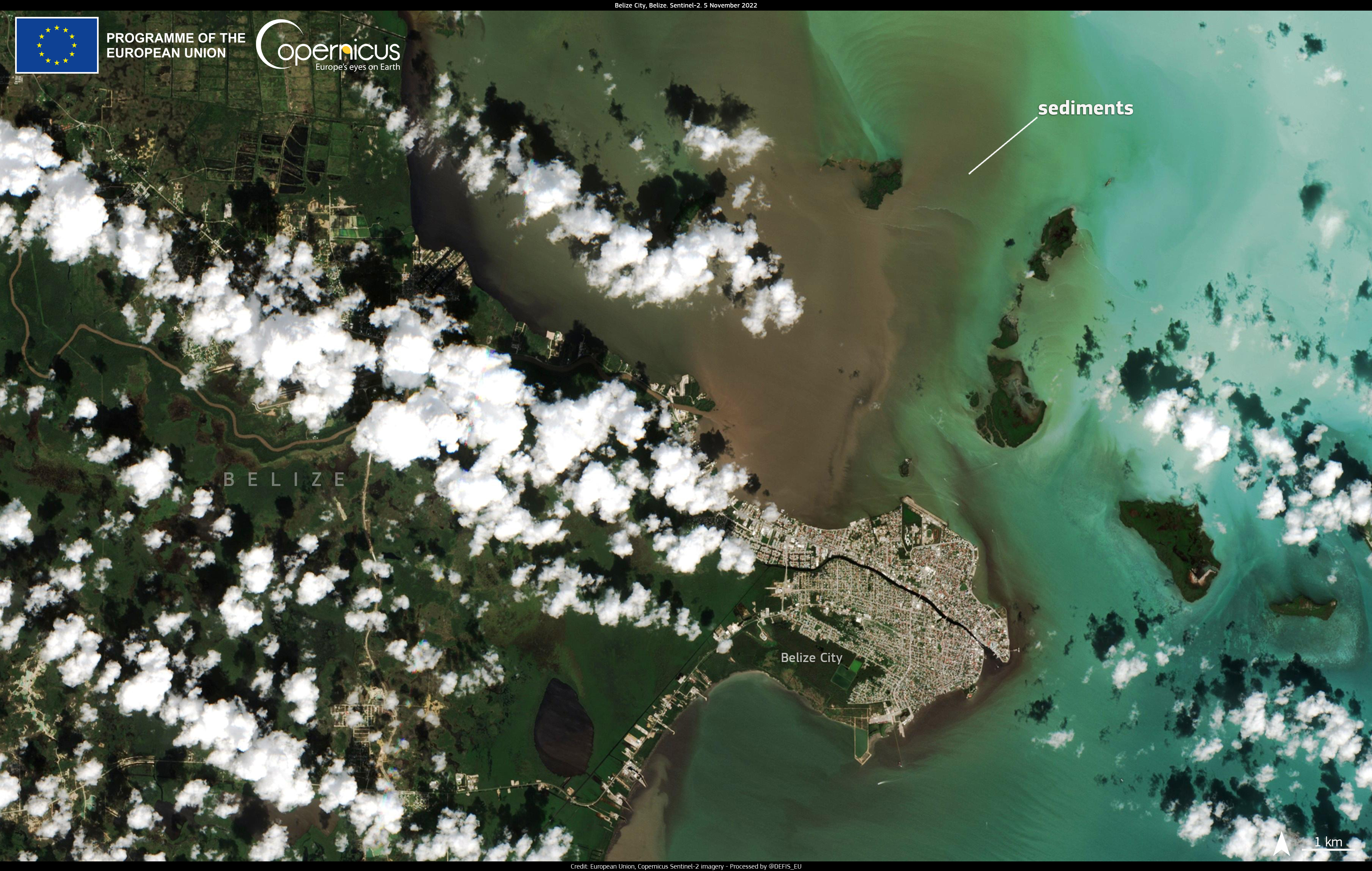
Sediments stirred up along the coast of Belize from river discharge, following Hurricane Lisa’s landfall.

Although Lisa had not yet become a tropical cyclone by October 30, advisories were initiated on the system as Potential Tropical Cyclone Fifteen at 21:00 UTC that day to allow for the issuance of tropical storm watches for Jamaica and Grand Cayman, as the system passed to the south and west. A hurricane warning was issued for the entire coast of Belize as Lisa approached, as well as from Chetumal to Costa Maya along the coast of the Mexican state of Quintana Roo, in anticipation of flash flooding, hurricane-force winds and rainfall accumulations of over 7 in (180 mm). A tropical storm warning was issued along the northern coasts of Guatemala and Honduras as well. In advance of Lisa's passage near the country, Guatemalan president Alejandro Giammattei ordered food rations to be sent to vulnerable parts of the nation.

=== Belize ===
Lisa caused intense and destructive flooding across much of Belize. The highest recorded amount of rain fell at the Mayan ruin site of Altun Ha, peaking at 8.43 in (214 mm), although it is estimated that up to 9 in (230 mm) of rain fell in northeastern Belize. A storm surge of 3-5 feet (0.9-1.5 meters) inundated much of the coastline of Belize, particularly in the Belize District in the northeastern portion of the country, and water levels were raised by as much as 7 ft (2.1 m) above normal tide levels near and to the north of Lisa's center onshore. Reports of strong winds, fallen trees, and power line and roof damage were reported as far inland as the Cayo District in the western Belize. Nearly 5,000 homes were damaged across Belize, and a further 500 were completely destroyed. 6,500 families were severely affected by Lisa across the country. A total of 172,000 people were impacted by the hurricane, and at least 5,000 were temporarily displaced by its passage into state-run shelters.

Much of Belize City, the country's largest city, was inundated with water at the height of the storm, and suffered particularly severe damage. The area was left without power and potable water during and immediately following Lisa's passage, as the storm uprooted trees, downed power lines and flooded streets. Widespread roof damage also occurred. While no detailed damage reports were provided by Belizean authorities, significant damage to infrastructure, utilities, agriculture, and boats were reported across the country, with many of them centered on Belize City and the nearby village of Ladyville. About 1,221 people were housed in shelters in Belize City. Several parts of the Belize power system required extensive repairs following the storm. Total damage from Lisa across Belize was estimated at US$100 million.

Following the hurricane, the Pan American Health Organization (PAHO), a regional division of the World Health Organization, sent a Disaster Response Team to assist in recovery from Lisa. Medical kits, food and water, and hygiene products were among the supplies distributed. PAHO also coordinated with Belize's Ministry of Health and Wellness to survey for food-borne illnesses and possible disease outbreaks following the storm. A disaster response emergency fund was launched by the Belize Red Cross to assist over 1,000 families affected by the storm.

=== Elsewhere in Central America ===
Intense flooding, heavy rains and gusty winds, but ultimately moderate damage, took place in portions of northern Guatemala, particularly in Melchor de Mencos, the major border city between Guatemala and Belize. Flooding and landslides were worst in Petén, Guatemala's northernmost department, where 143 people were evacuated and 48 were placed in shelters. Heavy rains afflicted the northern coast of Honduras, particularly the Bay Islands, although minimal damage was recorded there.

=== Mexico ===
Heavy rainfall from Lisa extended into southern Mexico as the storm crossed over the area, bringing continued flooding and mudslide threats. The storm continued to generate heavy rainfall over parts of the area as it turned north into the Gulf of Mexico. The cyclone disrupted the World Wide Technology Championship of the PGA Tour in Cancún, Quintana Roo, forcing players to seeks shelter and disrupting games.

== See also ==
- Weather of 2022
- Tropical cyclones in 2022
- List of Category 1 Atlantic hurricanes
- Other storms of the same name
- Hurricane Richard (2010) – took a similar track and had a similar intensity
- Hurricane Earl (2016) – took a similar track and caused a comparable amount of damage in Belize
- Hurricane Nana (2020) – took a similar track and affected similar areas
