= 1942 Atlantic hurricane season =

- Season summary map

Seasonal boundaries
- First system formed: August 3, 1942
- Last system dissipated: November 11, 1942

Strongest storm
- Name: "Matagorda"
  - Maximum winds: 115 mph (185 km/h) (1-minute sustained)
  - Lowest pressure: 950 mbar (hPa; 28.05 inHg)

Seasonal statistics
- Total depressions: 13
- Total storms: 11
- Hurricanes: 4
- Major hurricanes (Cat. 3+): 1
- Total fatalities: 17
- Total damage: $30.6 million (1942 USD)

Related articles
- 1942–1948 Pacific hurricane seasons; 1942 Pacific typhoon season; 1940s North Indian Ocean cyclone seasons

The 1942 Atlantic hurricane season was one of seven seasons to feature multiple hurricane landfalls in Texas. The season officially lasted from June 16 to October 31. These dates conventionally delimit the period of each year when most tropical cyclones form in the Atlantic basin. A total of 11 tropical storms from 1942 are listed in the Atlantic hurricane database, with two additional tropical depressions. The first system of the year, a tropical depression, developed over the central Gulf of Mexico on June 3, while the last system, the Belize hurricane, dissipated over the Yucatán Peninsula on November 11. After the depression dissipated on June 3, the season remained dormant until the next system developed two months later. In mid-August, a hurricane made landfall in Texas, causing about $790,000 (1942 US$) in damage. (Note: All damage totals are in 1942 US$ unless otherwise noted.)

The most significant tropical cyclone of the season, known as the Matagorda hurricane, developed on August 23. After striking the Yucatán Peninsula, the storm entered the Gulf of Mexico and intensified into a Category 3 hurricane on Saffir–Simpson scale, becoming the only major hurricane of the season. (Note: A major hurricane is a storm that ranks as Category 3 or higher on the Saffir–Simpson scale.) The hurricane devastated southern Texas, with damage as far inland as San Antonio. Eight fatalities and about $26.5 million in damage were reported. Several of the proceeding tropical systems left little impact on land, though the remnants of the ninth tropical storm contributed to severe flooding in Virginia. In November, a hurricane caused extensive impact in several coastal communities of Belize (then known as British Honduras). The hurricane left nine deaths and about $4 million in damage.

The season's activity was reflected with an accumulated cyclone energy (ACE) rating of 66 units, below the 1931–1943 average of 91.2. ACE is a metric used to express the energy used by a tropical cyclone during its lifetime. Therefore, a storm with a longer duration will have high values of ACE. It is only calculated at six-hour increments in which specific tropical and subtropical systems are either at or above sustained wind speeds of 39 mph (63 km/h), which is the threshold for tropical storm intensity. Thus, tropical depressions are not included here.

== Systems ==
=== Tropical Storm One ===
- Tropical storm (SSHWS)
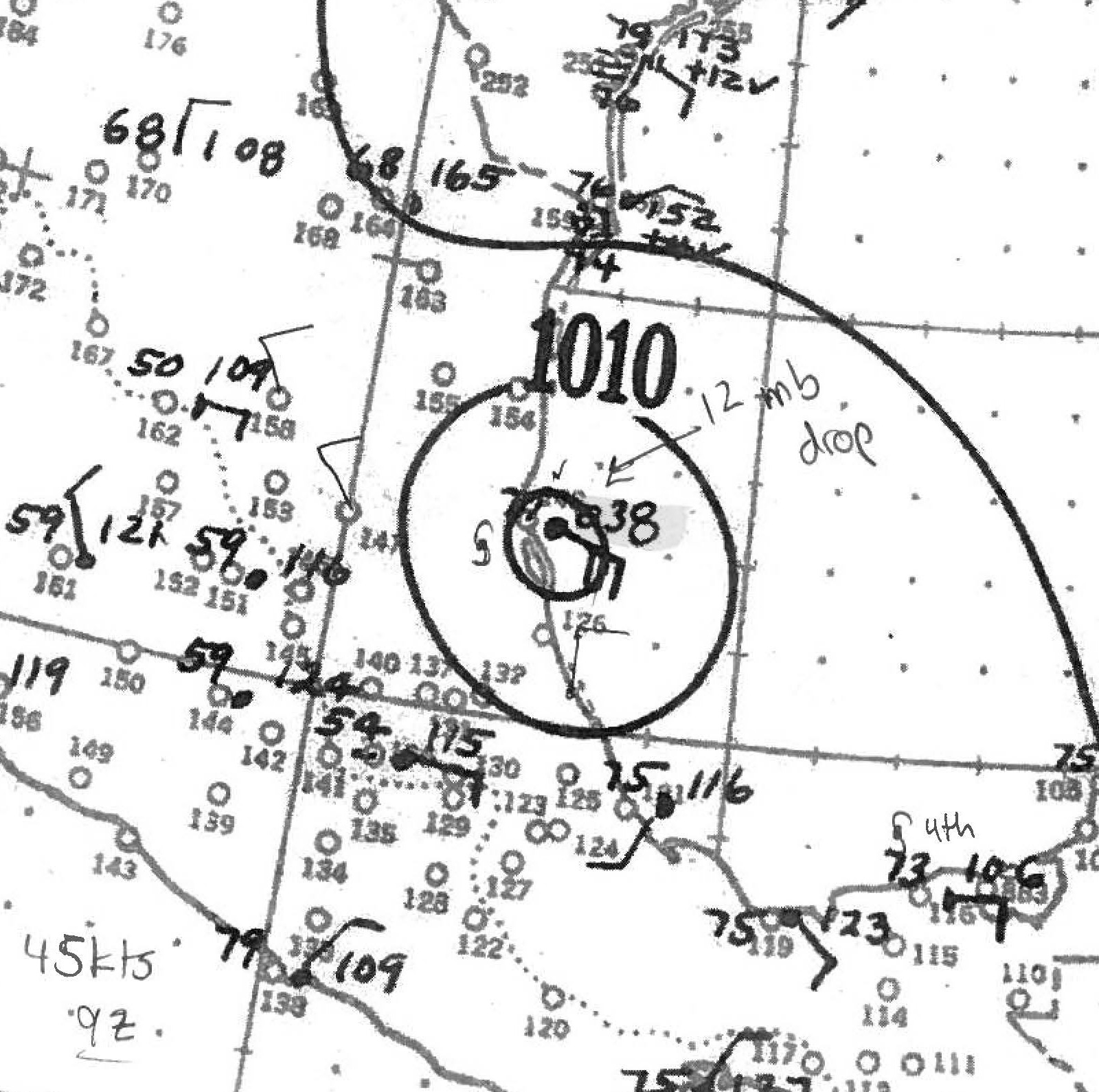
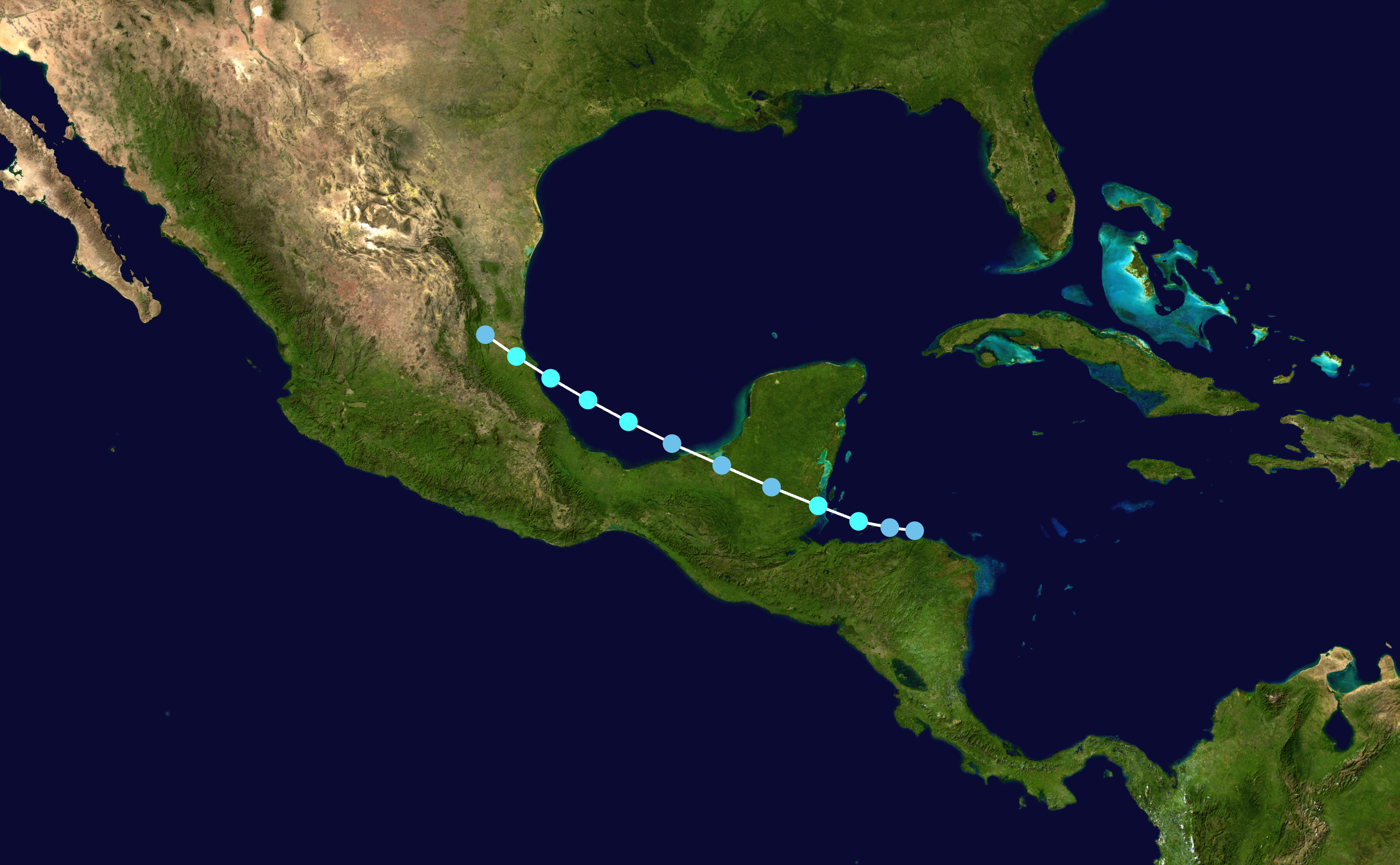
- Duration: August 3 – August 5
- Peak intensity: 60 mph (95 km/h) (1-min); 1004 mbar (hPa)

On August 1, a low-pressure area was first detected in the vicinity of Puerto Cabezas, Nicaragua. However, data at the time was not conclusively indicative of a tropical cyclone. The tropical low was later analyzed to have sufficiently organized to be classified as a tropical depression by 0000 UTC on August 3, as it moved westward in the Gulf of Honduras. Six hours later, the depression was estimated to have intensified into a tropical storm based on barometric readings from Tela, Honduras, and Belize City. Shortly after, the tropical storm made landfall in British Honduras with winds of 40 mph (65 km/h). The tropical cyclone weakened to a tropical depression during its trek over the Yucatán Peninsula before emerging into the Bay of Campeche on August 4. Over water, the storm reintensified and attained its peak intensity with winds of 60 mph (95 km/h) at 0600 UTC on the following day . Three hours later, the storm made its final landfall south of Tampico, Mexico, at the same intensity, before weakening over the mountainous terrain of Mexico and dissipating late on August 5.

Upon landfall near Tampico, a station in the city recorded a minimum barometric pressure of 1,004 mbar (hPa; 29.65 inHg), the lowest pressure measured in association with the storm. Due to a lack of available weather ships in the region because of World War II, no ships documented the tropical cyclone. In Texas, the tropical cyclone caused light rainfall, damaging local cotton crops. Strong wind gusts were observed in the Rio Grande Valley.

=== Hurricane Two ===
- Category 1 hurricane (SSHWS)
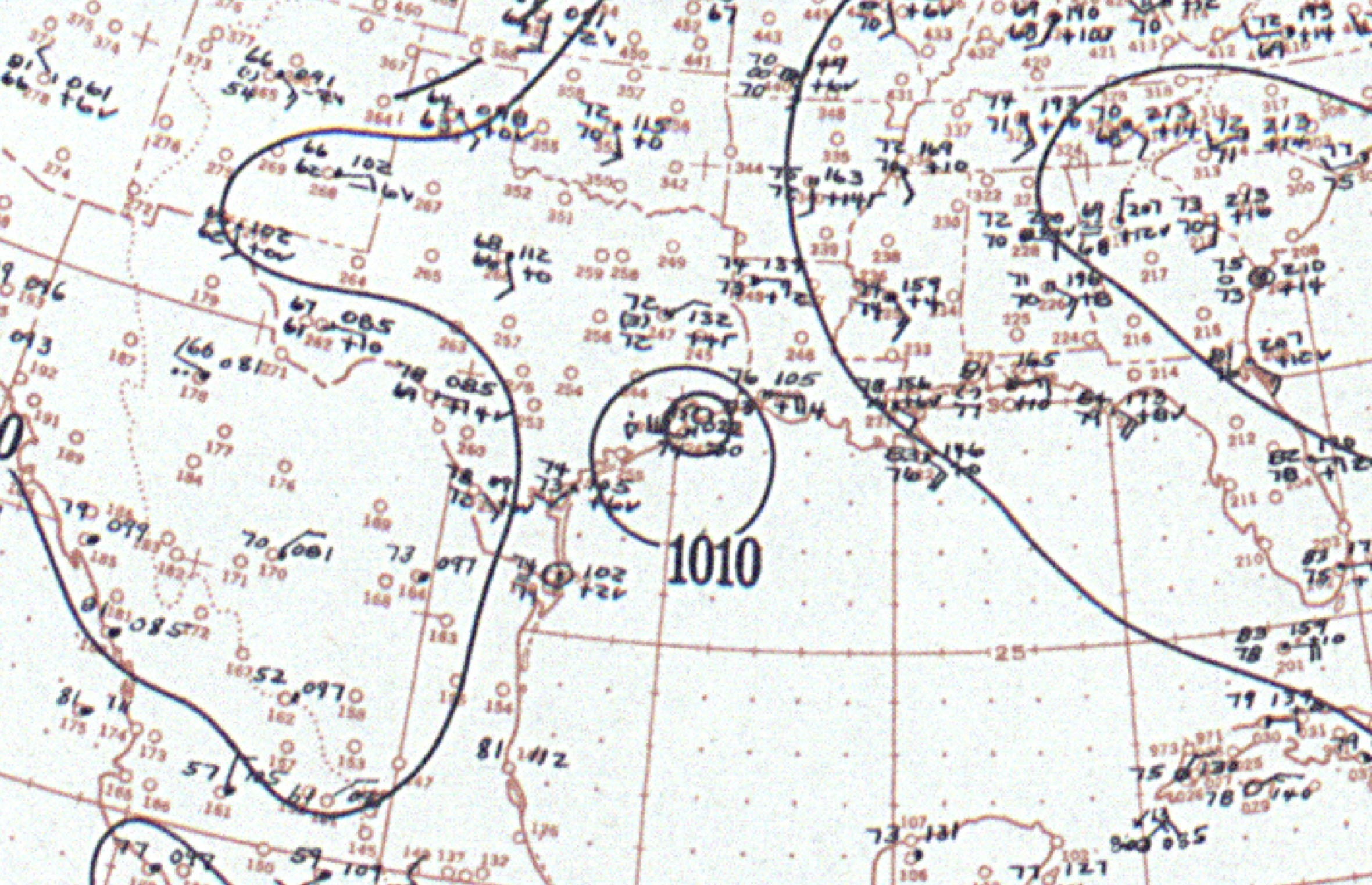
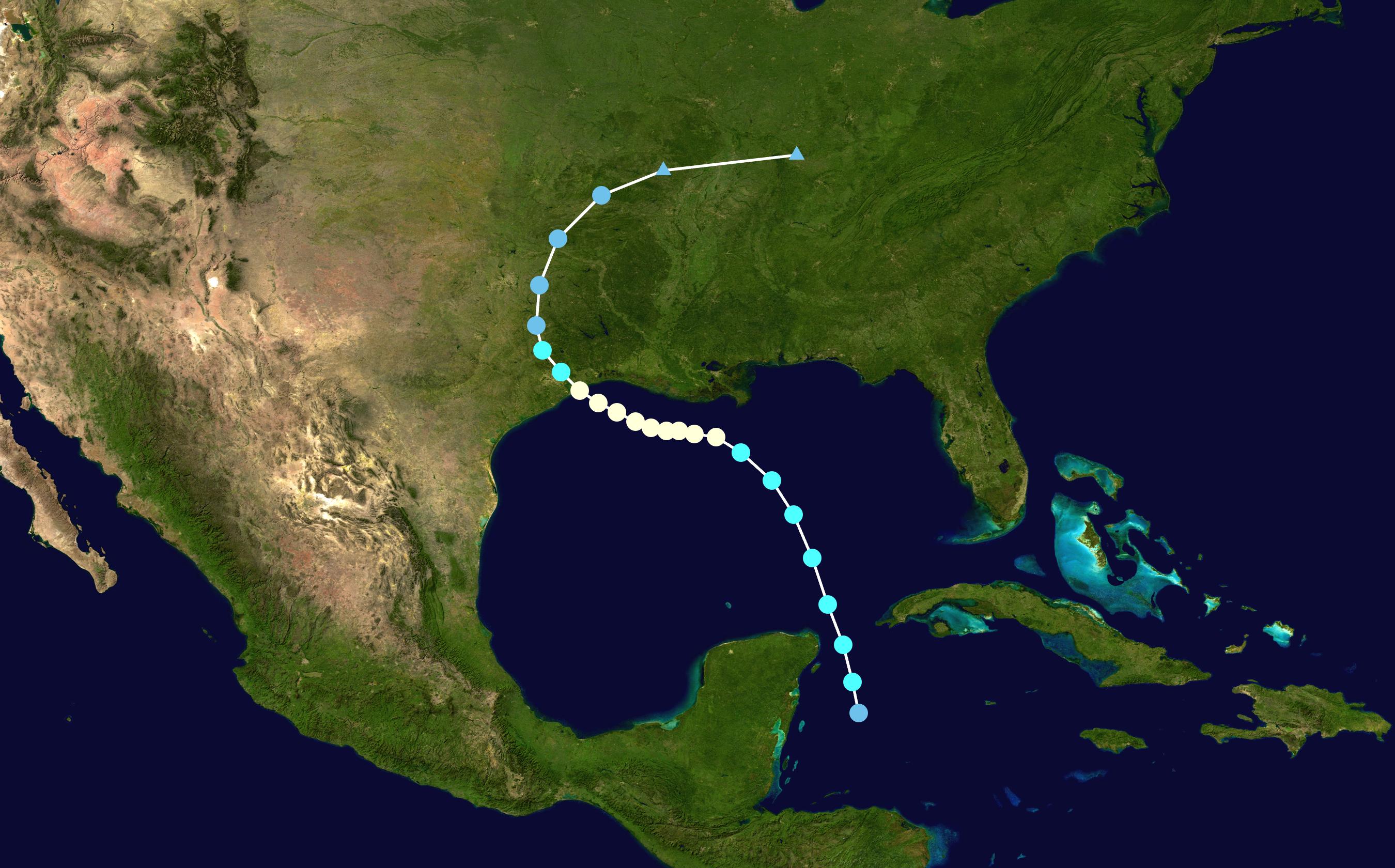
- Duration: August 17 – August 23
- Peak intensity: 80 mph (130 km/h) (1-min); 992 mbar (hPa)

A tropical wave developed into a tropical depression about 140 mi (230 km) east of the Yucatán Peninsula on August 17. Moving north-northwestward, the depression soon strengthened into a tropical storm. Early on August 18, the system crossed the Yucatán Channel and entered the Gulf of Mexico. While nearing the coast of Louisiana on August 19, the storm slowed down, turned westward, and intensified into a Category 1 hurricane. Late on August 19, the hurricane attained its maximum sustained wind speed of 80 mph (130 km/h). The cyclone curved west-northwestward and weakened slightly before making landfall near Crystal Beach, Texas, with winds of 75 mph (120 km/h) around 13:00 UTC on August 21. At landfall, the barometric pressure fell to 992 mbar (29.3 inHg) based on the pressure-wind relationship – the lowest pressure associated with the storm. The hurricane weakened after moving inland, falling to tropical storm status less than five hours later and to tropical depression intensity early on August 22. The system then curved northeastward and became extratropical over the Arkansas–Missouri state line, shortly before the remnants dissipated.

In Texas, tides reached 7 ft (2.1 m) above mean low water at High Island. The abnormally high tides damaged piers and small crafts, while two barges and a tow boat also collapsed. Strong winds were reported in some areas, with sustained winds of 72 mph (116 km/h) observed in Port Arthur. Trees and power lines were downed throughout the city, while trees and signs were toppled in Beaumont. On the Bolivar Peninsula, three oil derricks were toppled. More than 50% of customers of the Gulf States Electrical Company were left without power. In Henderson, winds unroofed a number of homes and destroyed a few others. The hurricane dropped up to 5.33 in (135 mm) of rainfall. Near Hallsville, about 500 ft (150 m) of the Texas and Pacific Railway was washed out. Precipitation destroyed about 15% of rice crops in Jefferson County. Overall, damage reached approximately $790,000.

=== Hurricane Three ===
- Category 3 hurricane (SSHWS)
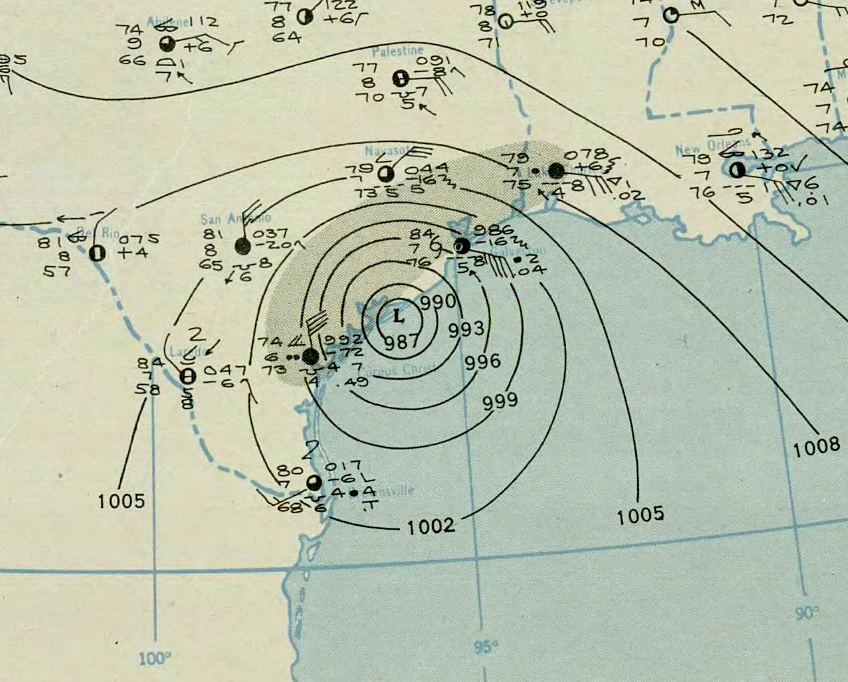
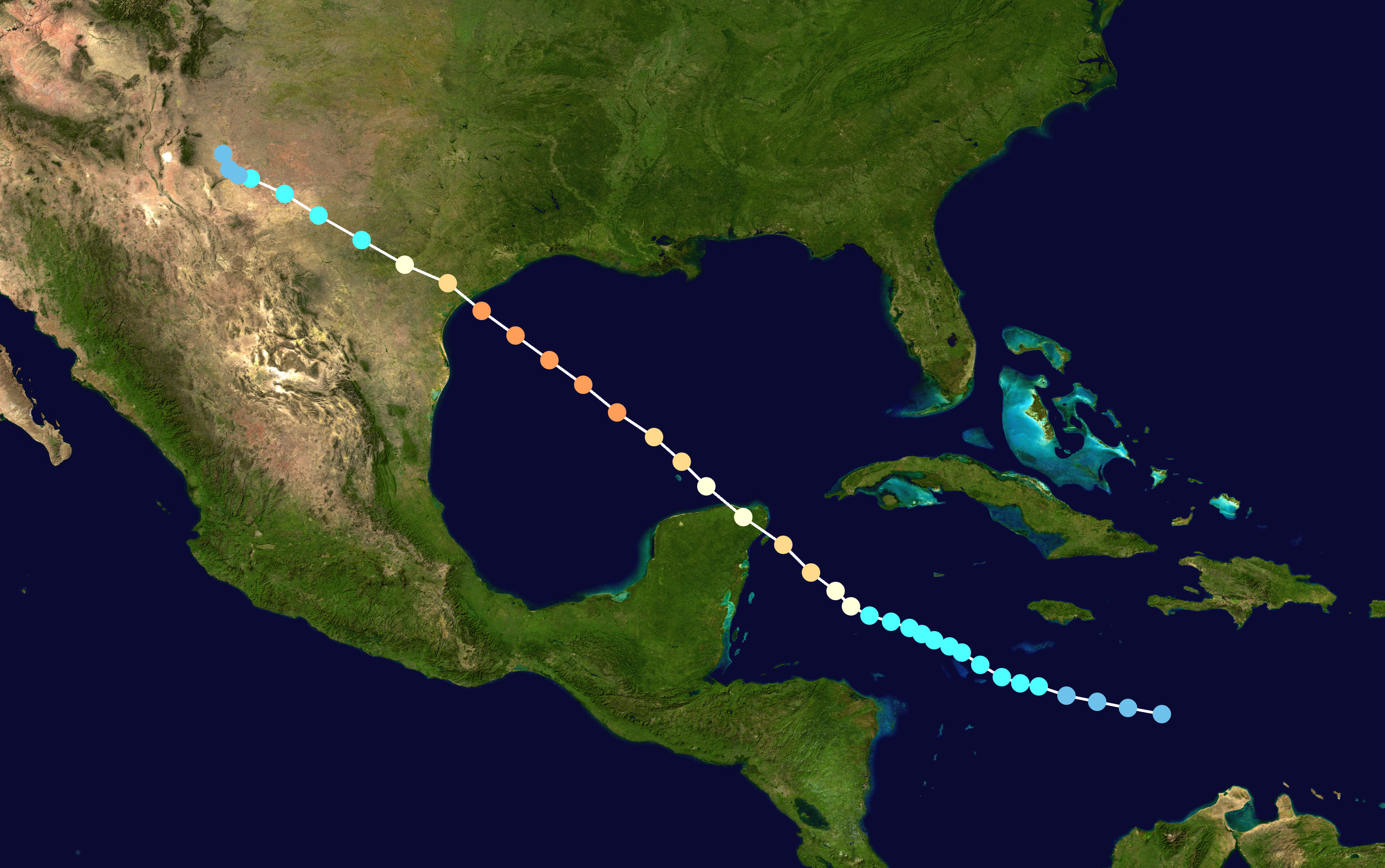
- Duration: August 23 – September 1
- Peak intensity: 115 mph (185 km/h) (1-min); 950 mbar (hPa)

The Matagorda Hurricane of 1942

A tropical wave developed into a tropical depression over the central Caribbean Sea around 12:00 UTC on August 23. Trekking west-northwestward, the system strengthened into a tropical storm about 24 hours later. It gradually intensified, and reach hurricane status south of Jamaica on August 25. The hurricane then curved northwest and intensified into a Category 2 hurricane on August 27. Early the following day, the cyclone made landfall near Cancún, Quintana Roo, with winds of 105 mph (165 km/h). The storm weakened to a Category 1 during its brief transit across the Yucatán Peninsula, before re-intensifying into a Category 2 hurricane over the Gulf of Mexico late on August 28. The hurricane quickly strengthened, and attained its peak intensity on August 29 as a Category 3 hurricane with winds of 115 mph (185 km/h). Nearing the Texas Gulf Coast, the storm maintained intensity, and was still a major hurricane by the time it made a final landfall near Matagorda, Texas, on August 30. Continuing inland, the hurricane weakened, and degenerated into a remnant low over New Mexico on August 31.

At the hurricane's first landfall near the northeastern tip of the Yucatán Peninsula, little information was documented on the storm's impacts. However, as the storm approached the Texas coast, widespread evacuations took place, including the evacuation of roughly 50,000 people from Galveston alone. Upon making landfall, the hurricane caused extensive damage in coastal regions. In Matagorda, storm surge peaking at 14.7 ft (4.5 m) inundated the city and damaged many others. Strong winds from the storm wreaked havoc as far inland as San Antonio. The winds leveled numerous buildings and uprooted trees, in addition to causing widespread power outages. Crops in the areas affected saw large losses, particularly the rice crop. Rainfall associated with the storm was relatively light, due to the hurricane's rapid forward motion once inland, peaking at 9.3 in (0.24 mm) in Woodsboro. Overall, the storm caused $26.5 million in damages and eight deaths.

=== Hurricane Four ===
- Category 2 hurricane (SSHWS)
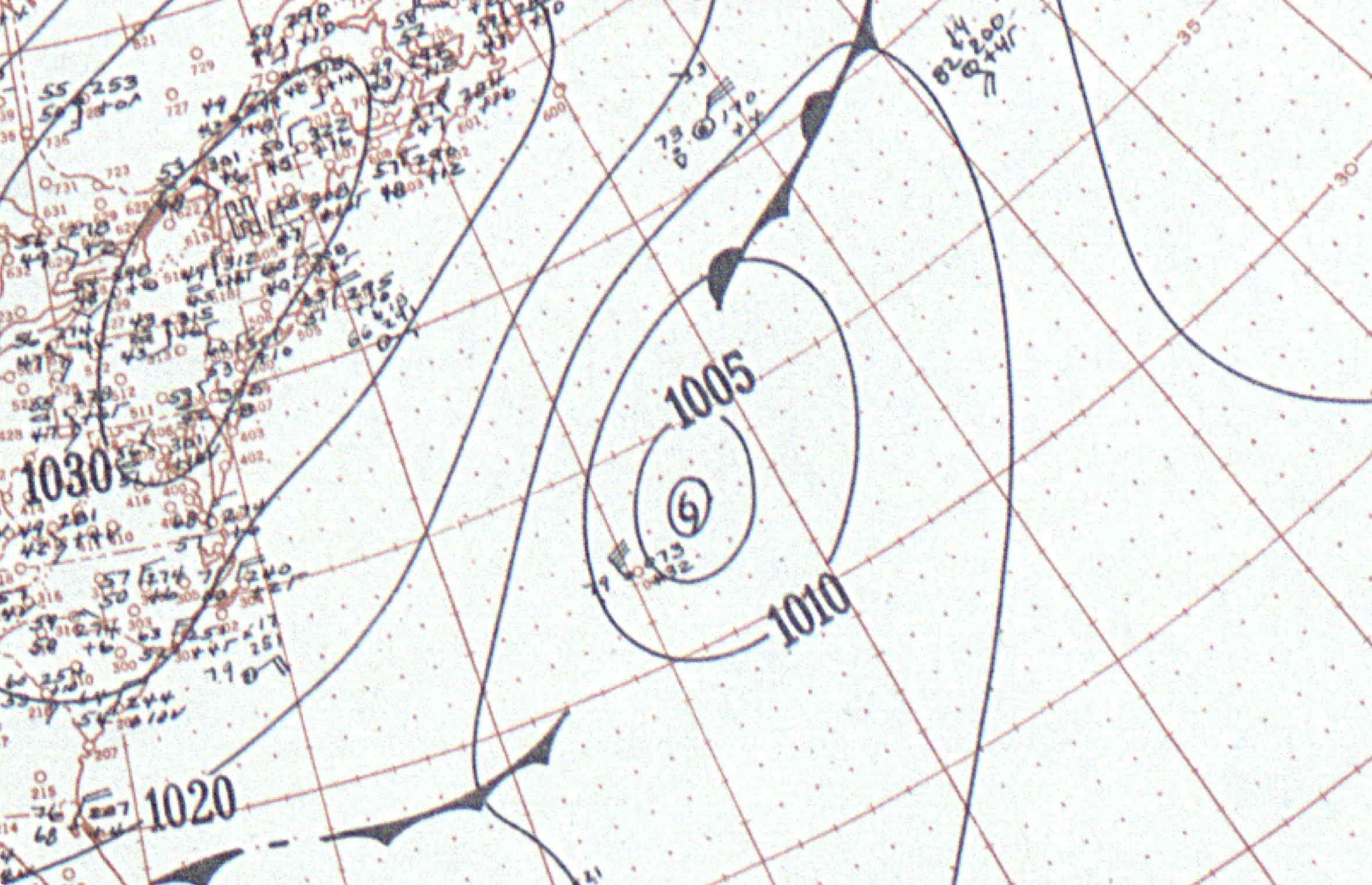
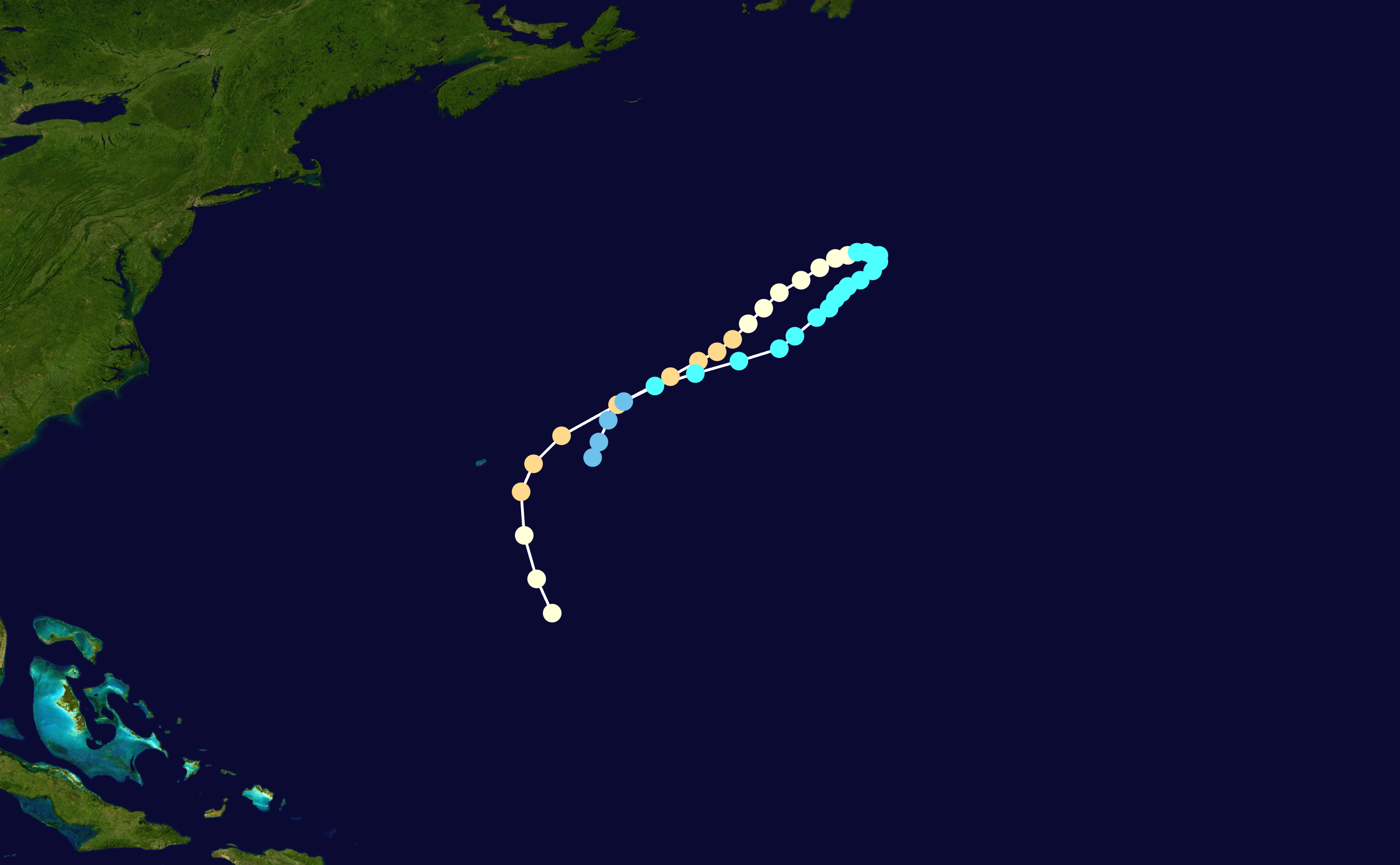
- Duration: August 25 – September 3
- Peak intensity: 110 mph (175 km/h) (1-min);

The fourth tropical storm of the season was first detected as a minimal hurricane about 355 mi (570 km) southeast of Bermuda on August 25. Due to lack of data, little further information is known about the origin of this system. Historical weather maps showed a tropical storm on August 24, though there was insufficient evidence of a closed circulation. The hurricane moved north-northwestward and intensified into a Category 2 hurricane early on August 26. The storm then made its closest approach to Bermuda, passing about 90 mi (140 km) east of island, which observed a sustained wind speed of 64 mph (103 km/h). At 06:00 UTC on August 26, the cyclone peaked with maximum sustained winds of 110 mph (175 km/h). The hurricane produced sustained winds of . The system slowly weakened as it continued northeastward, falling to Category 1 intensity early on August 28 and deteriorating to a tropical storm late on August 29. Around that time, the cyclone decelerated and curved to the southwest. Early on September 3, the system weakened to a tropical depression, several hours before dissipating about 205 mi (330 km) east-northeast of Bermuda.

=== Tropical Storm Five ===
- Tropical storm (SSHWS)
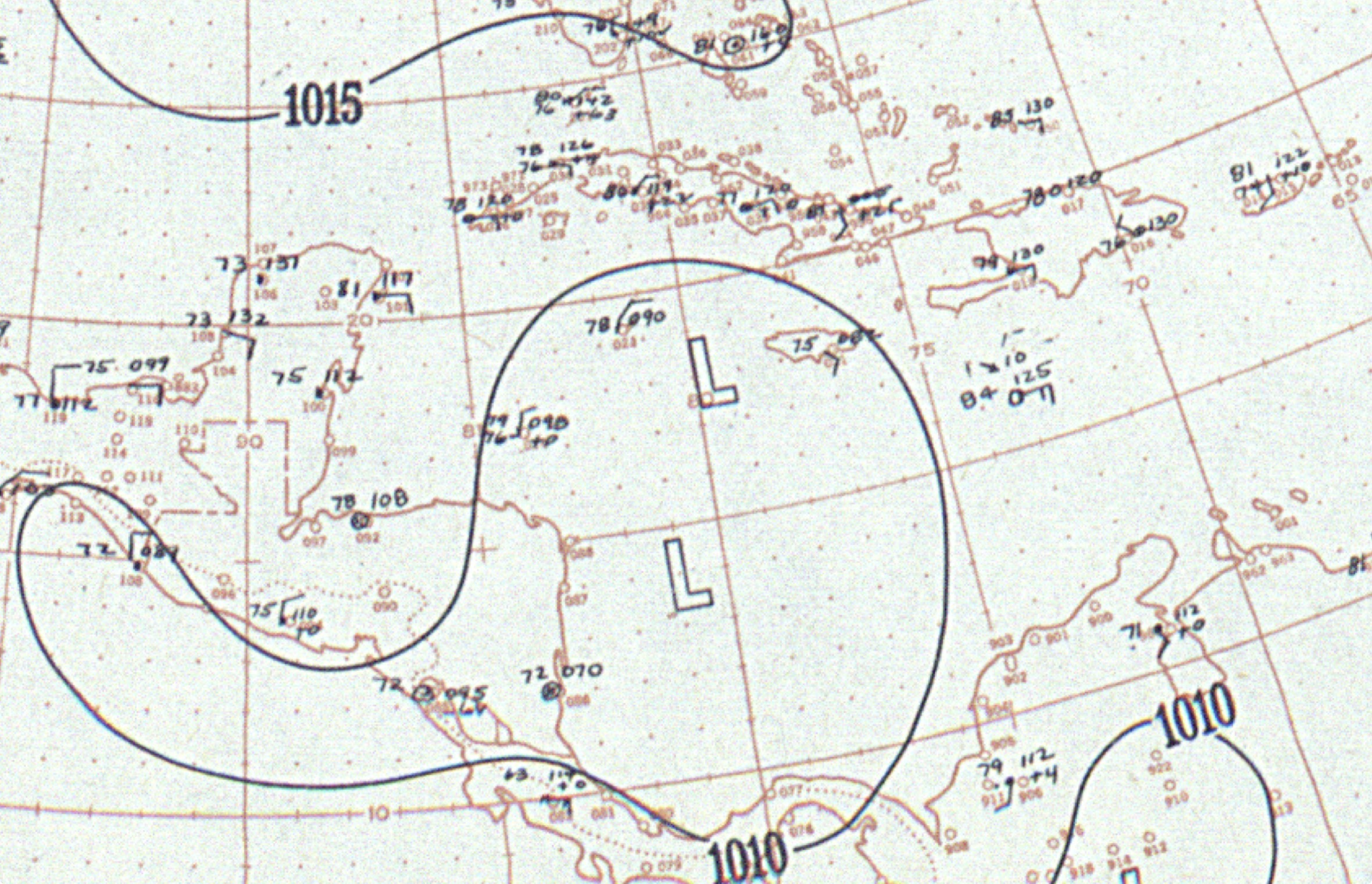
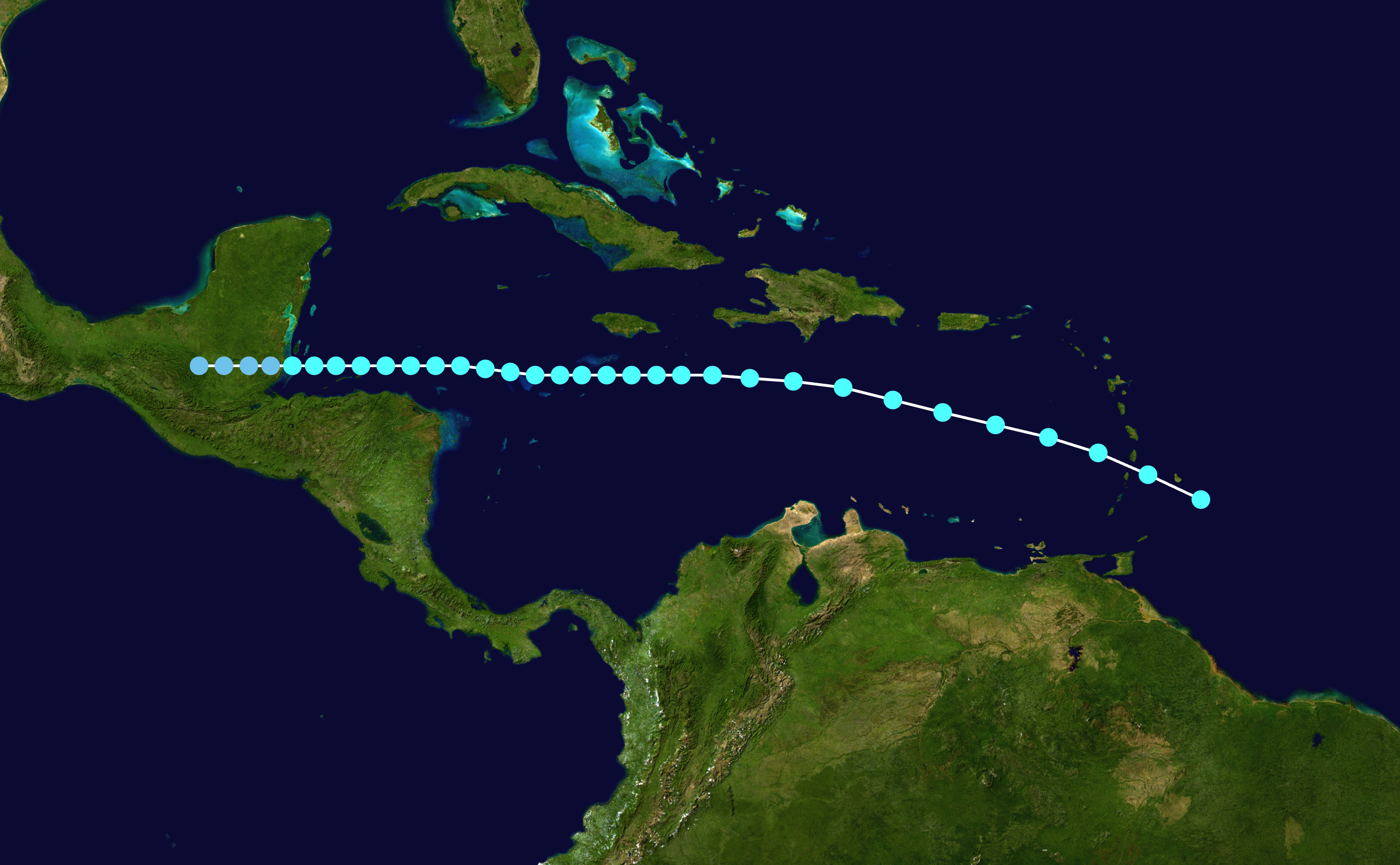
- Duration: September 15 – September 23
- Peak intensity: 50 mph (85 km/h) (1-min); 1002 mbar (hPa)

The fifth tropical storm of the season formed on September 15 about 60 mi (95 km) southeast of Barbados. The system moved west-northwestward and passed between Saint Lucia and Saint Vincent early the next day. After entering the Caribbean, the cyclone slowly intensified and peaked with sustained winds of 50 mph (85 km/h) on September 17. The following day, the storm curved westward while located south of Hispaniola. While the system passed south of Jamaica, rough seas and sustained winds of 30 mph (48 km/h) were reported at Morant Point. On September 21, the storm tracked to the north of Great Swan Island, which observed a barometric pressure near 1,002 mbar (29.6 inHg), the lowest known pressure associated with the cyclone. Thereafter, the storm began to slowly weaken. Just after 12:00 UTC on September 22, the system made landfall in Stann Creek District in Belize as a minimal tropical storm. The cyclone soon weakened to a tropical depression and dissipated near the Guatemala–Mexico border around 24 hours after moving inland.

=== Tropical Storm Six ===
- Tropical storm (SSHWS)
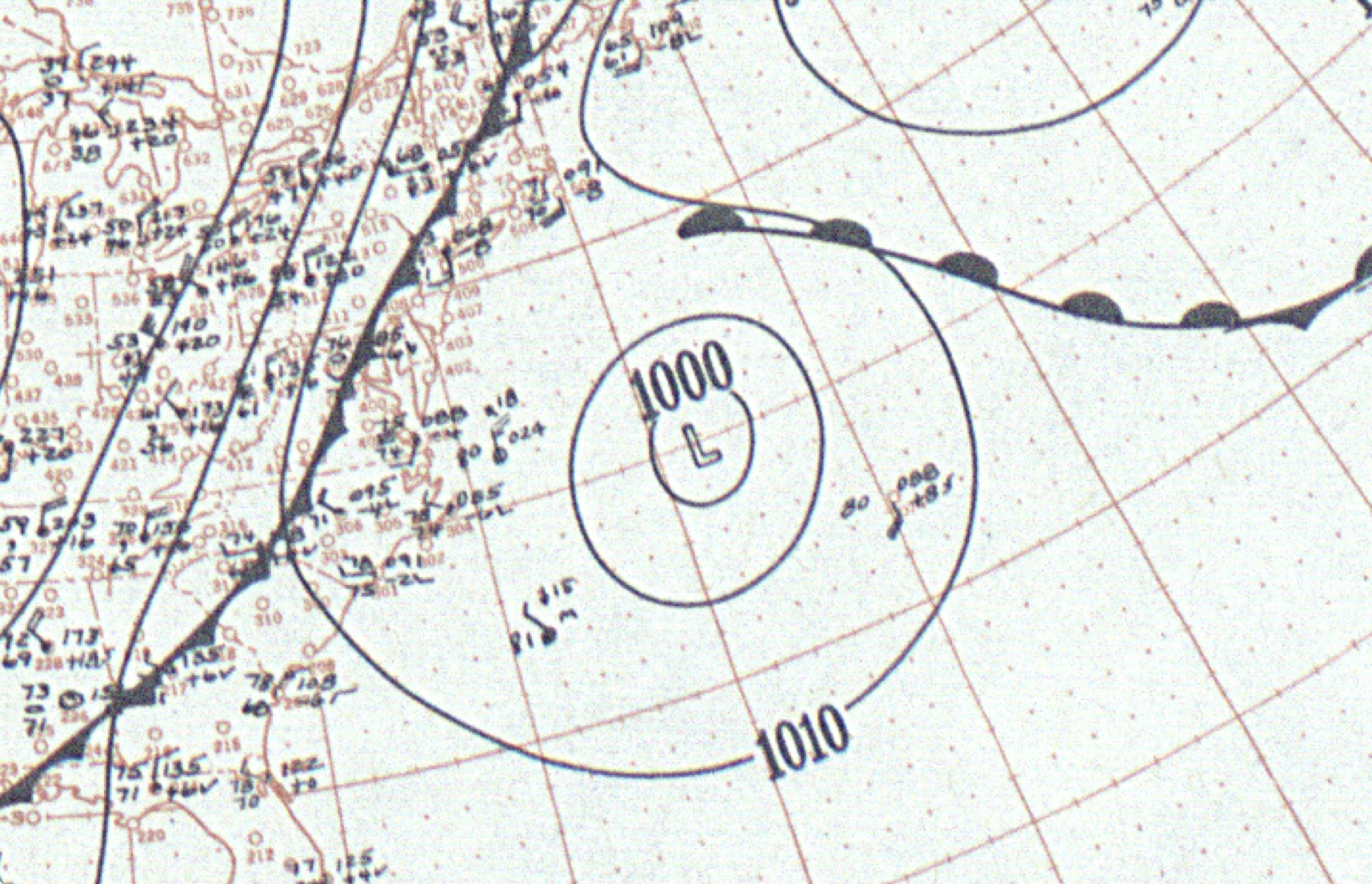
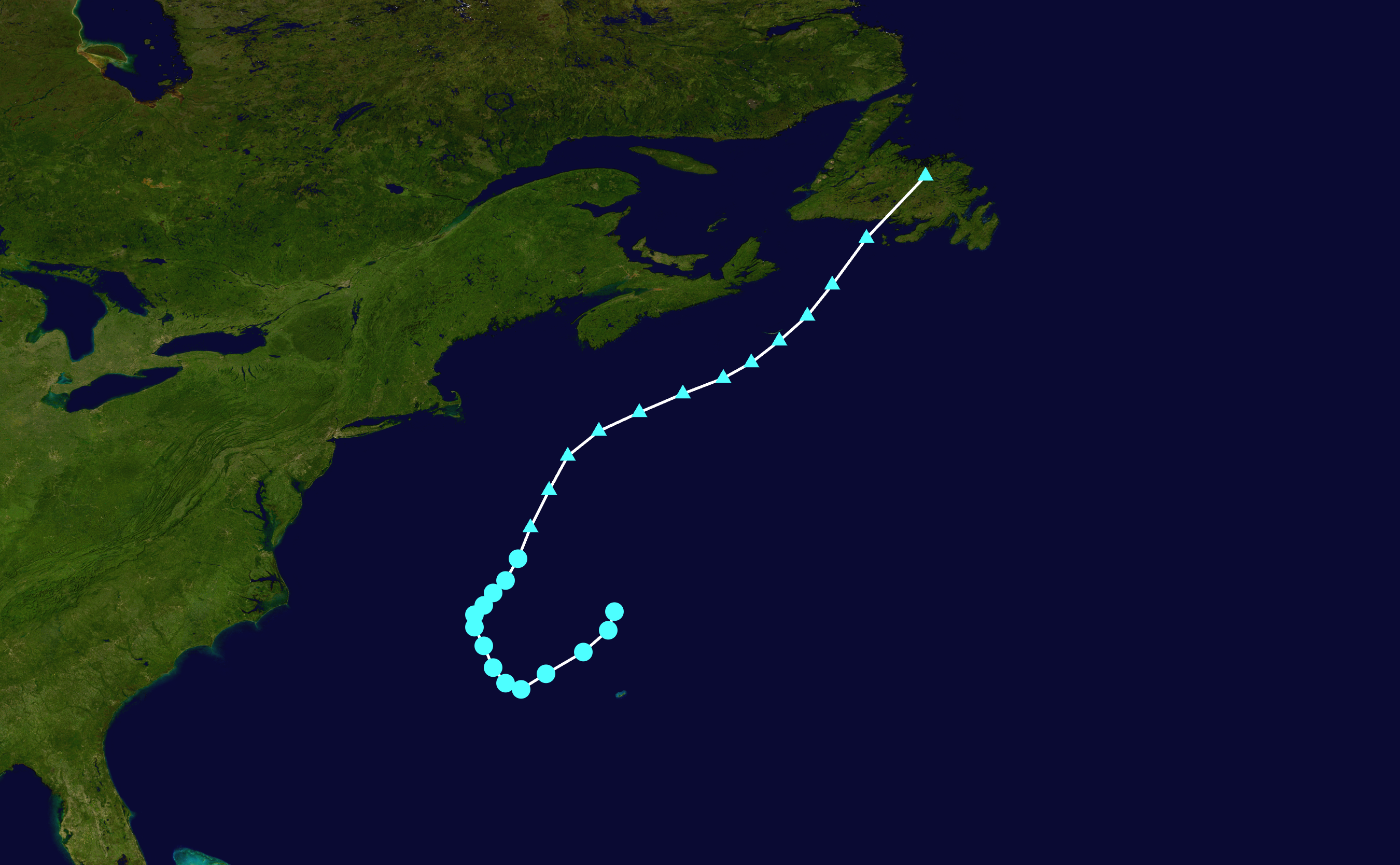
- Duration: September 18 – September 21
- Peak intensity: 50 mph (85 km/h) (1-min); 1000 mbar (hPa)

A low pressure area developed into a tropical storm around 12:00 UTC on September 18, while located about 180 mi (290 km) north of Bermuda. The storm moved southwestward and passed northwest of the island, which observed sustained winds of 29 mph (47 km/h). Late on September 19, the cyclone curved northwestward. The system intensified to reach maximum sustained winds of 50 mph (85 km/h) and a minimum barometric pressure of 1,000 mbar (30 inHg) on September 20. Early the next day, the cyclone curved northeastward and began losing tropical characteristics. By 00:00 UTC on September 22, the system had already completed its transition to an extratropical cyclone while located about 275 mi (445 km) southeast of Nantucket, Massachusetts. The extratropical remnants continued northeastward, striking Newfoundland before dissipating early on September 25.

=== Tropical Storm Seven ===
- Tropical storm (SSHWS)
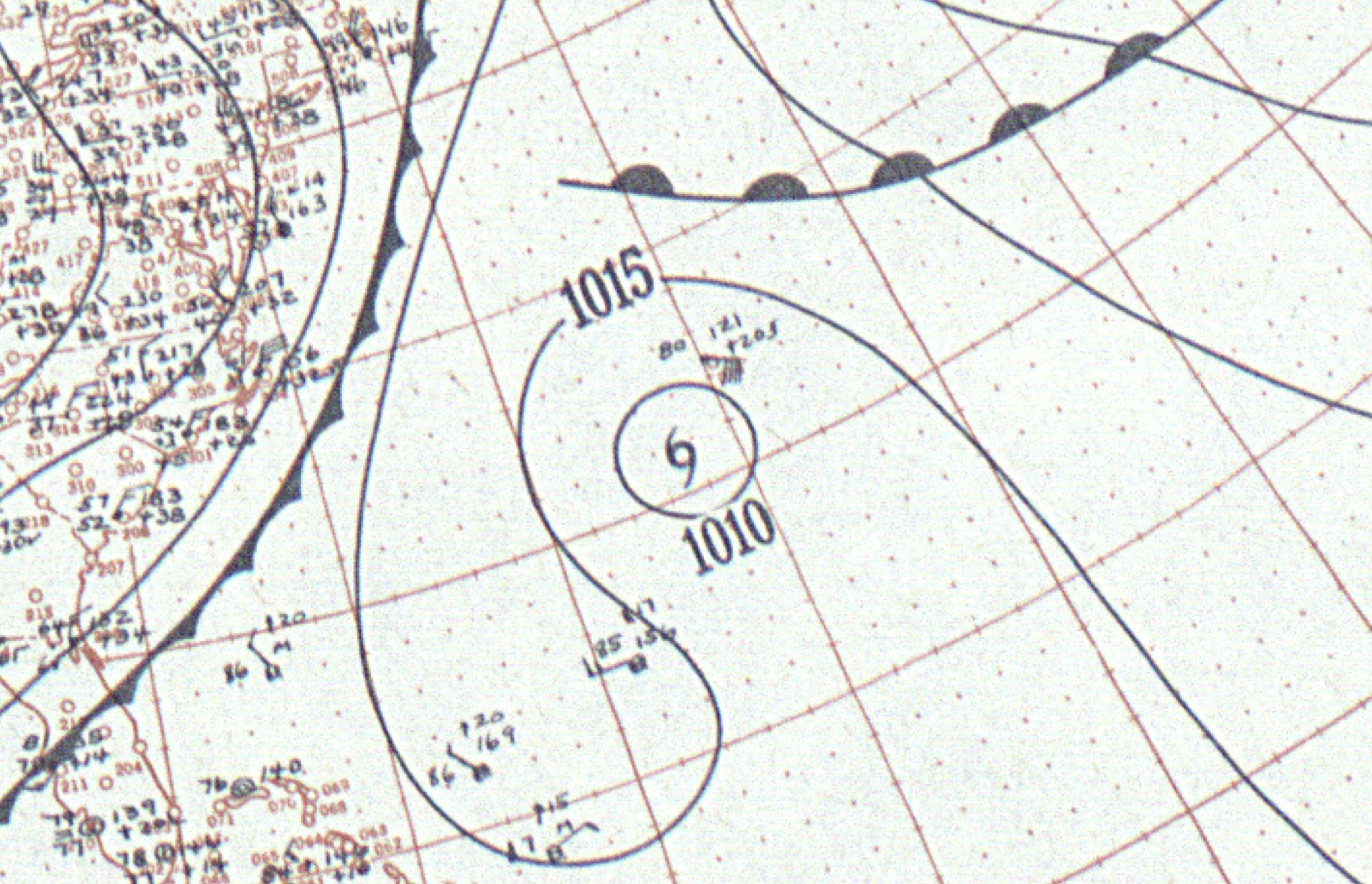
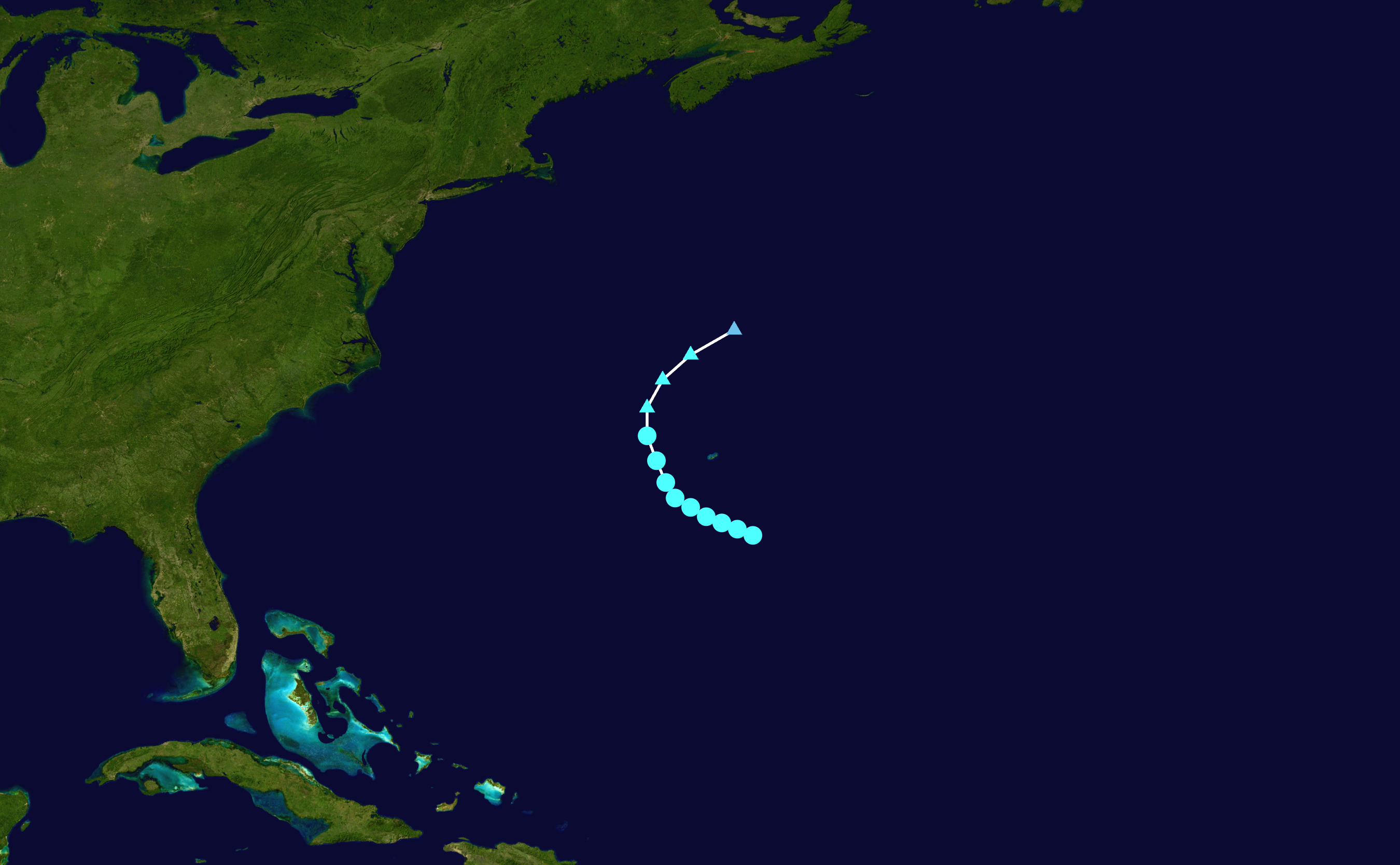
- Duration: September 27 – September 29
- Peak intensity: 50 mph (85 km/h) (1-min); 1010 mbar (hPa)

A low pressure area developed into a tropical storm about 185 mi (300 km) south-southeast of Bermuda early on September 27. On the following day, the storm's barometric pressure decreased to 1,010 mbar (30 inHg) – the lowest known pressure associated with the system. Moving west-northwestward, the cyclone produced winds of 40 mph (64 km/h) on Bermuda on September 28. Several hours later, the system began to move north-northwestward. Early on September 29, the storm attained its maximum sustained wind speed of 50 mph (85 km/h). However, by 12:00 UTC, the cyclone merged with a cold front about 160 mi (260 km) northwest of Bermuda.

=== Tropical Storm Eight ===
- Tropical storm (SSHWS)
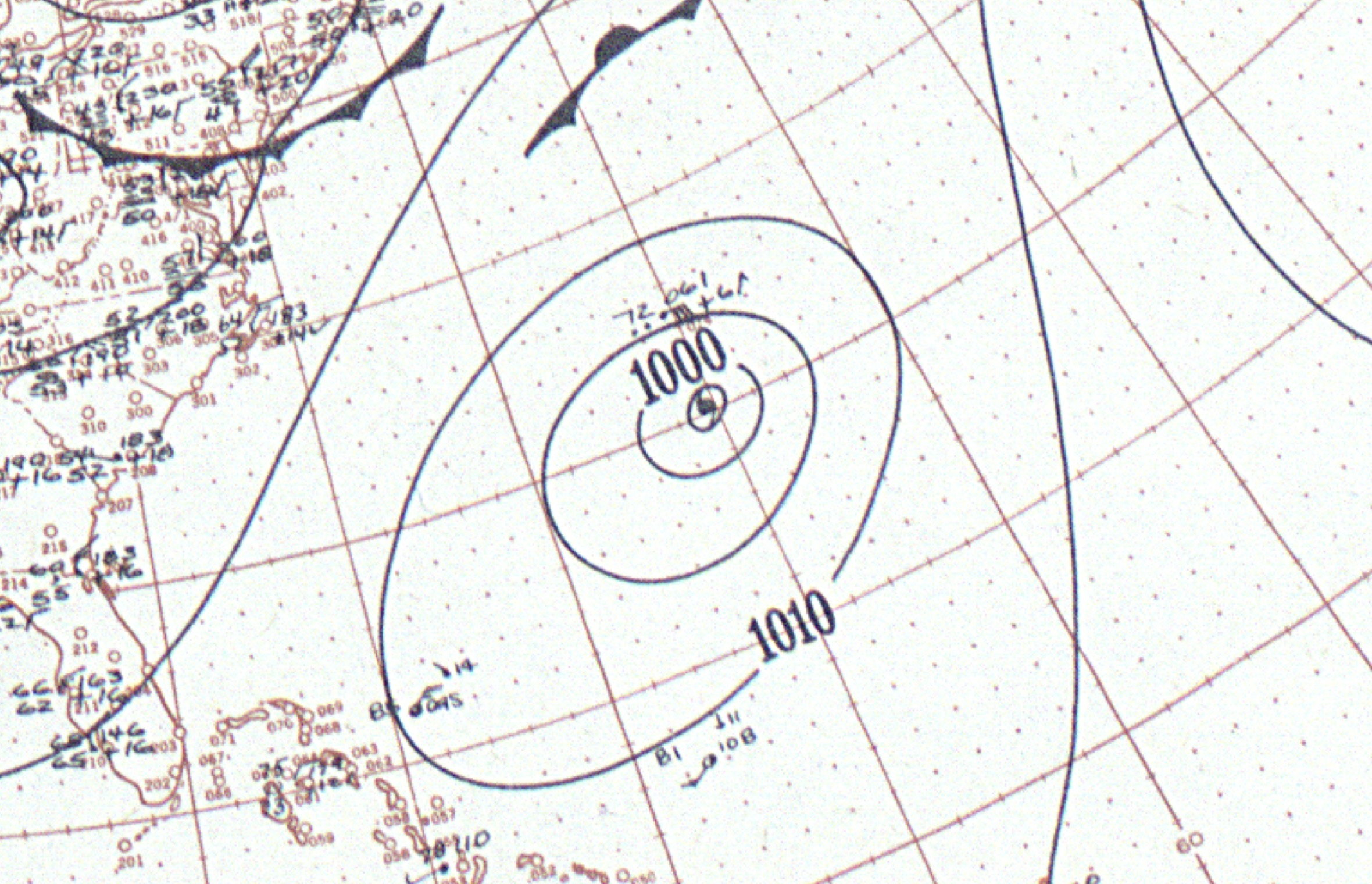
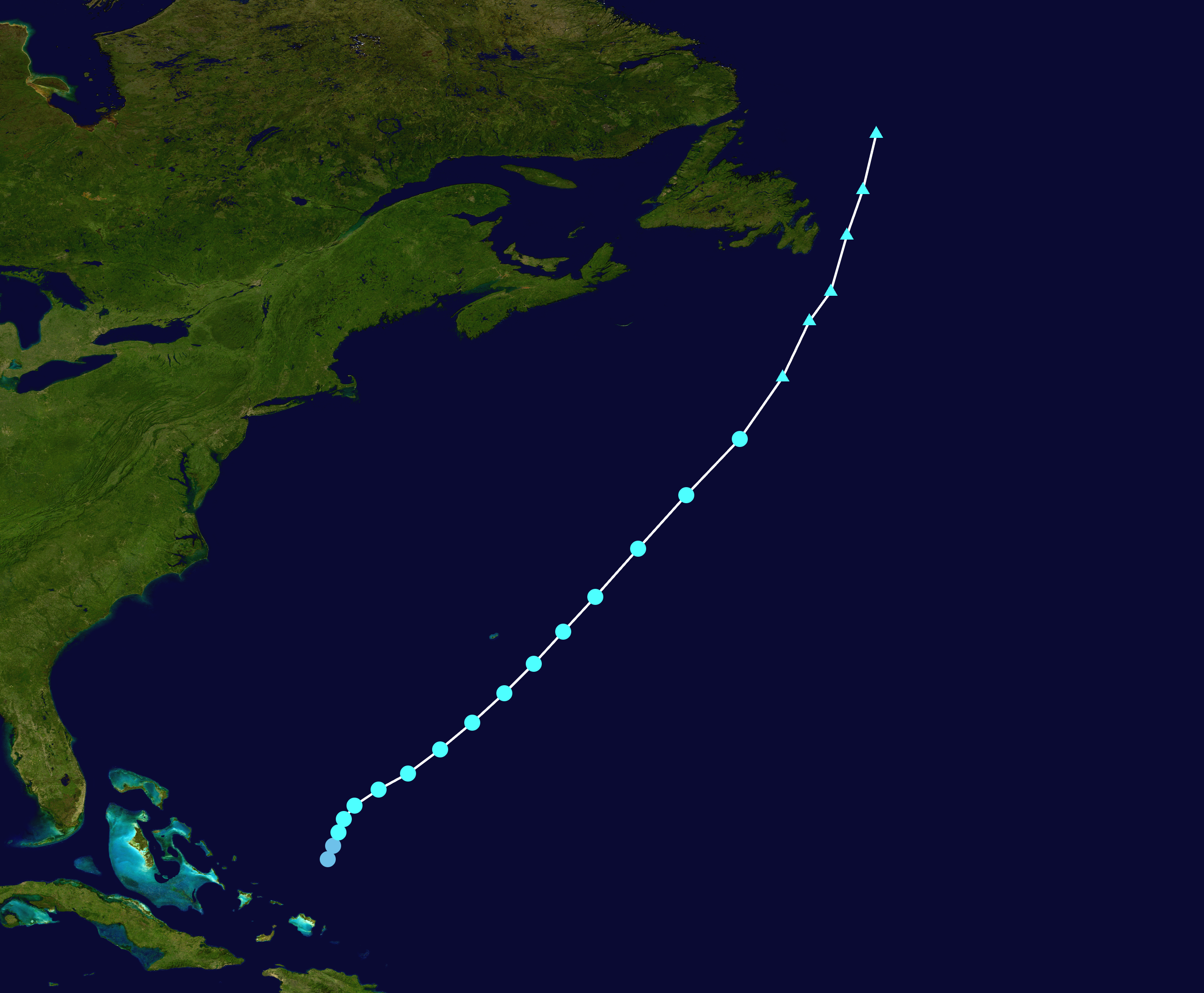
- Duration: September 30 – October 4
- Peak intensity: 70 mph (110 km/h) (1-min); 996 mbar (hPa)

On September 30, the next system developed north of the Turks and Caicos Islands. Initially a tropical depression, the cyclone intensified into a tropical storm early on October 1. Around 17:00 UTC, a ship recorded a barometric pressure of 991 mbar (29.3 inHg), which was reanalyzed as 996 mbar (29.4 inHg), the lowest pressure associated with the storm. The storm continued northeastward and reached maximum sustained winds of 70 mph (110 km/h) by October 2. On the following day, the system passed to the southeast of Bermuda, which observed sustained winds up to 46 mph (74 km/h). Due to lack of data, it is possible the storm intensified into a hurricane before completing the transition into an extratropical cyclone about 320 mi (510 km) south of Newfoundland on October 4. The remnant system continued northeastward until dissipating east of Newfoundland late on October 5.

=== Tropical Storm Nine ===
- Tropical storm (SSHWS)
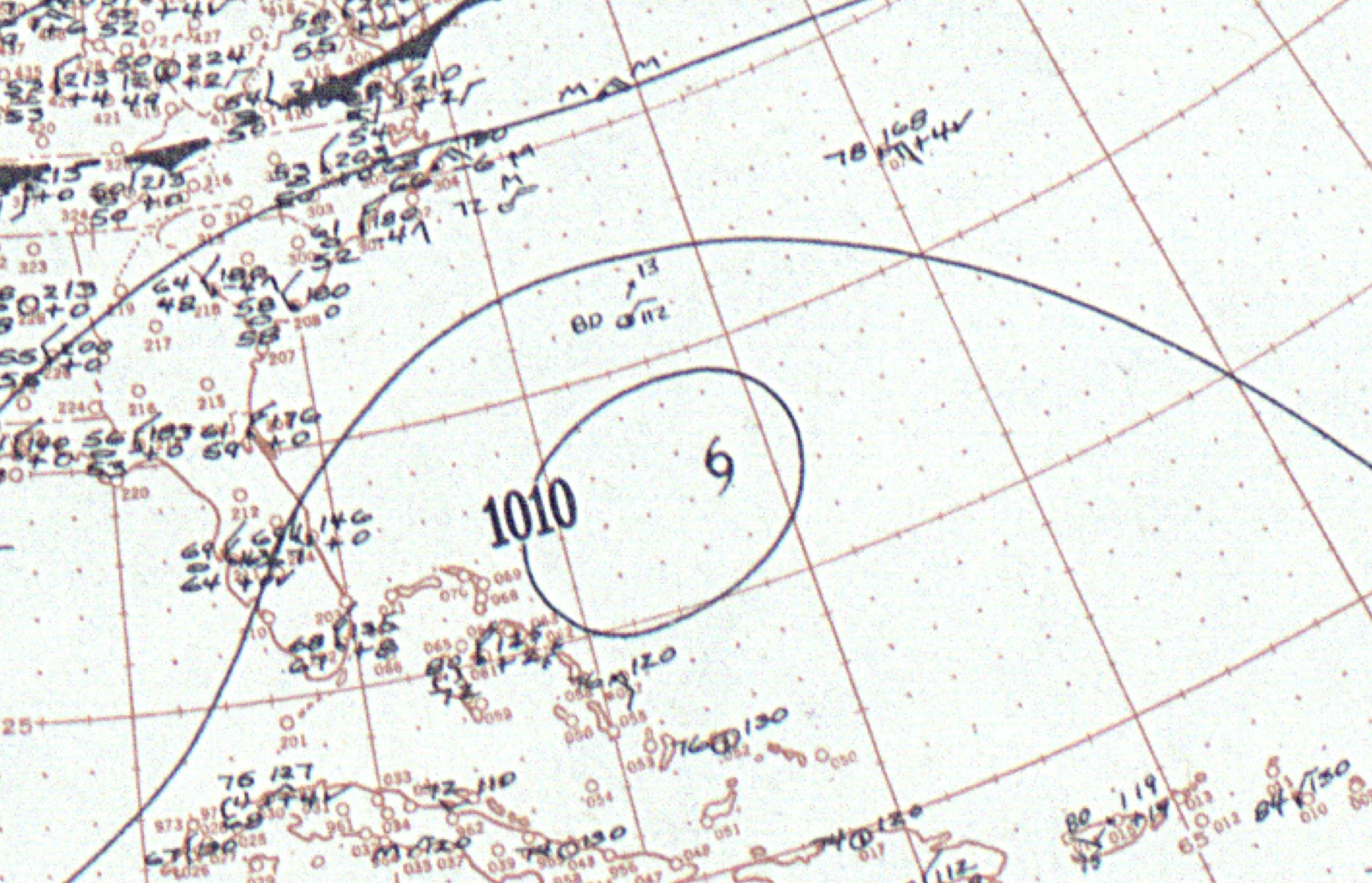
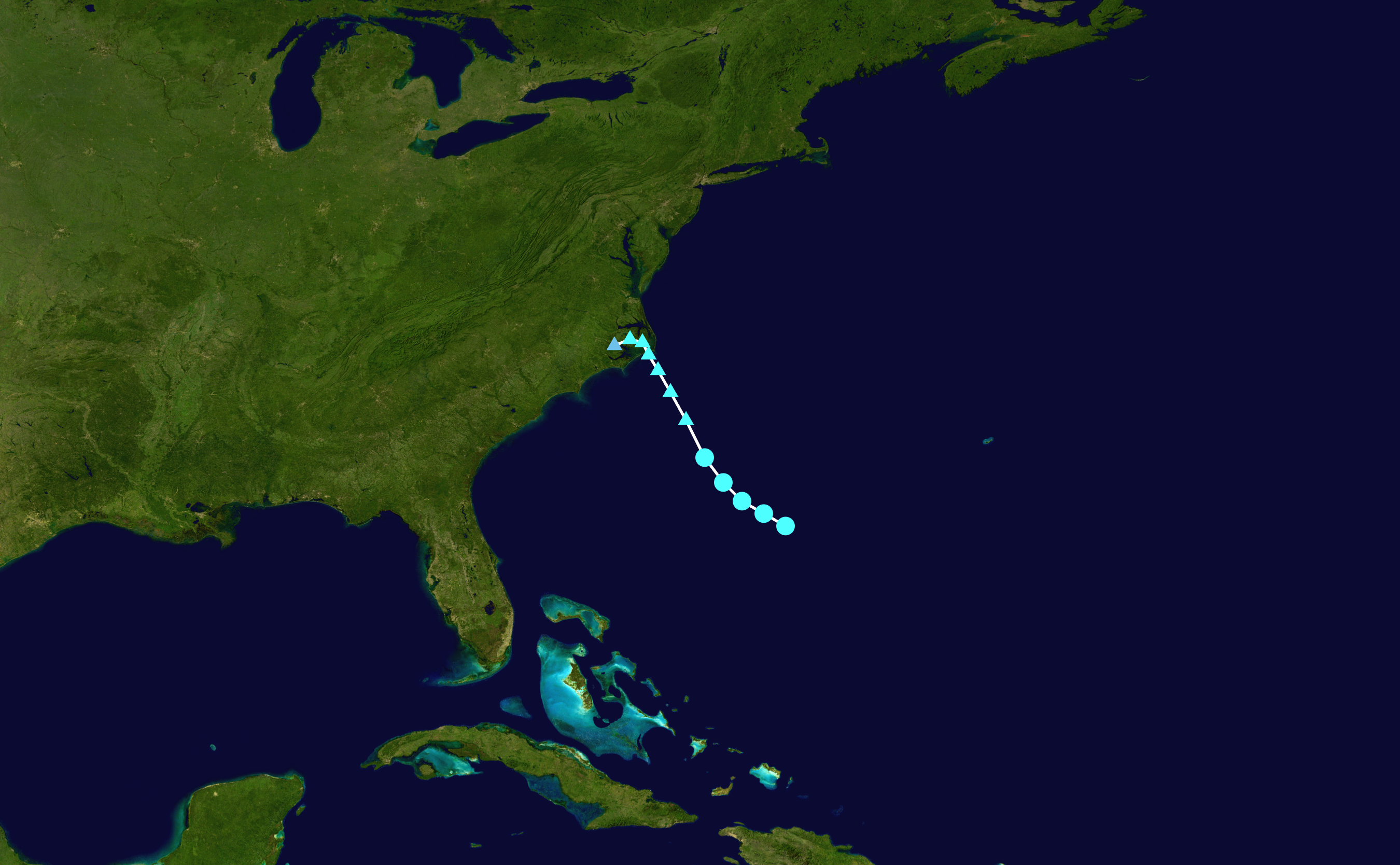
- Duration: October 10 – October 11
- Peak intensity: 45 mph (75 km/h) (1-min); 1002 mbar (hPa)

A tropical storm was first observed about midway between the Abaco Islands and Bermuda early on October 10. However, the storm was short lived. Around 06:00 UTC on the following day, the cyclone reached maximum sustained winds of 45 mph (75 km/h). Only six hours later, the system lost tropical characteristics while located about 160 mi (260 km), after the vortex became elongated while a frontal system approached the area. The remnants continued northwestward and moved ashore in North Carolina early on October 12, before dissipating early the following day.

Heavy rainfall was reported in northeastern North Carolina. The remnants contributed to severe flooding in northern Virginia. Although the remnant system dissipated by October 13, moisture laden-air brought by the system and persistent easterly winds resulted in orographic lift, causing four days of record rainfall. The Big Meadows area of Shenandoah National Park observed 18.9 in (480 mm) of precipitation, while rainfall totals above 5 in (130 mm) were common. Madison County recorded 12.3 in (310 mm) of precipitation in only 24 hours. Numerous highways were washed out and many bridges were swept away, interrupting traffic for three to four days. Severe damage to crops occurred. About 1,300 people were left homeless in Albemarle, Spotsylvania, Stafford, and Warren counties. In the Washington, D.C. area, the rising Potomac River forced the evacuation of 722 families. Several homes were swept from their foundation, while hundreds of others were flooded in Georgetown. Minor damage occurred at the Washington Navy Yard. Maine Avenue was inundated with about 1.5 ft (0.46 m) of water. One death occurred during the flood.

=== Tropical Storm Ten ===
- Tropical storm (SSHWS)
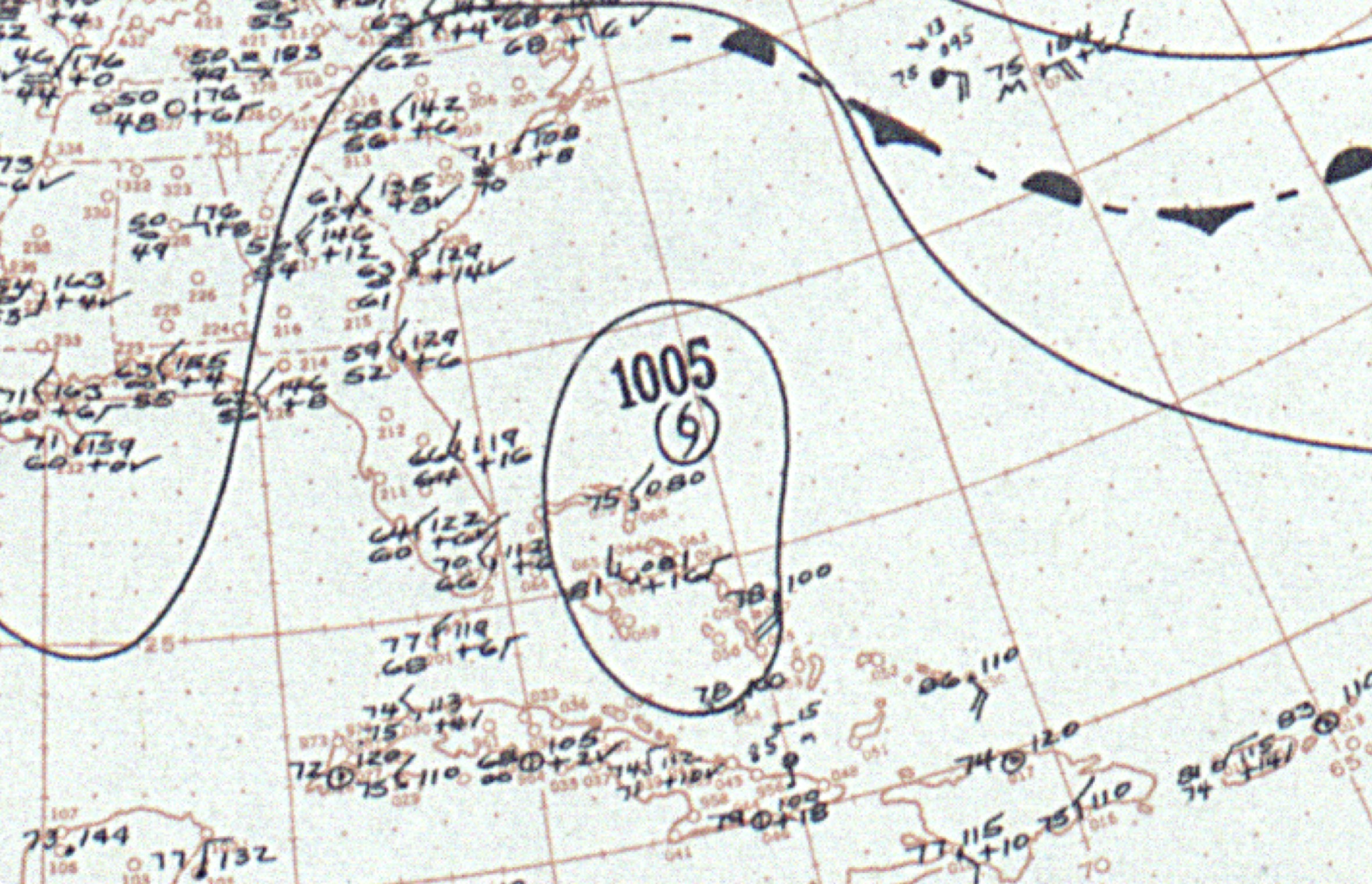
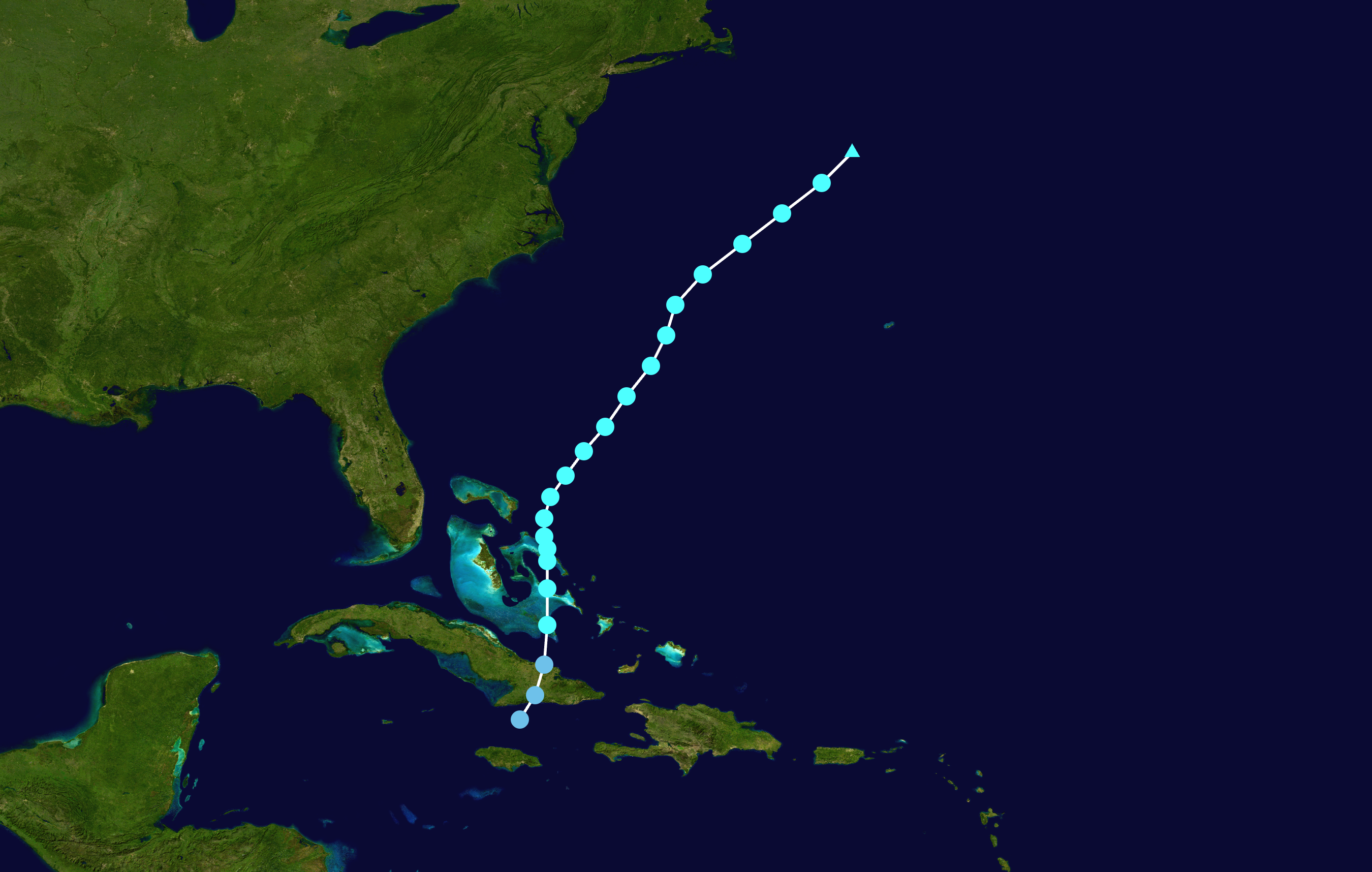
- Duration: October 13 – October 18
- Peak intensity: 50 mph (85 km/h) (1-min); 1005 mbar (hPa)

A tropical depression developed just offshore modern-day Granma Province in Cuba on October 13, moving ashore within six hours. After emerging into the Atlantic near Gibara early on October 14, the depression turned northward and soon intensified into a tropical storm. During the next 24 hours, the storm moved through the central Bahamas, striking or passing close to the islands of Exuma, Little San Salvador, and Eleuthera. A barometric pressure of 1,005 mbar (29.7 inHg) was observed on Eleuthera around 12:00 UTC on October 15, which was the lowest known pressure in relation to the system. The storm then turned northeastward and continued to slowly strengthen, peaking with maximum sustained winds of 50 mph (85 km/h) on October 16. By late on October 18, the cyclone merged with a cold front while situated about 305 mi (490 km) southeast of Massachusetts.

=== Hurricane Eleven ===
- Category 2 hurricane (SSHWS)
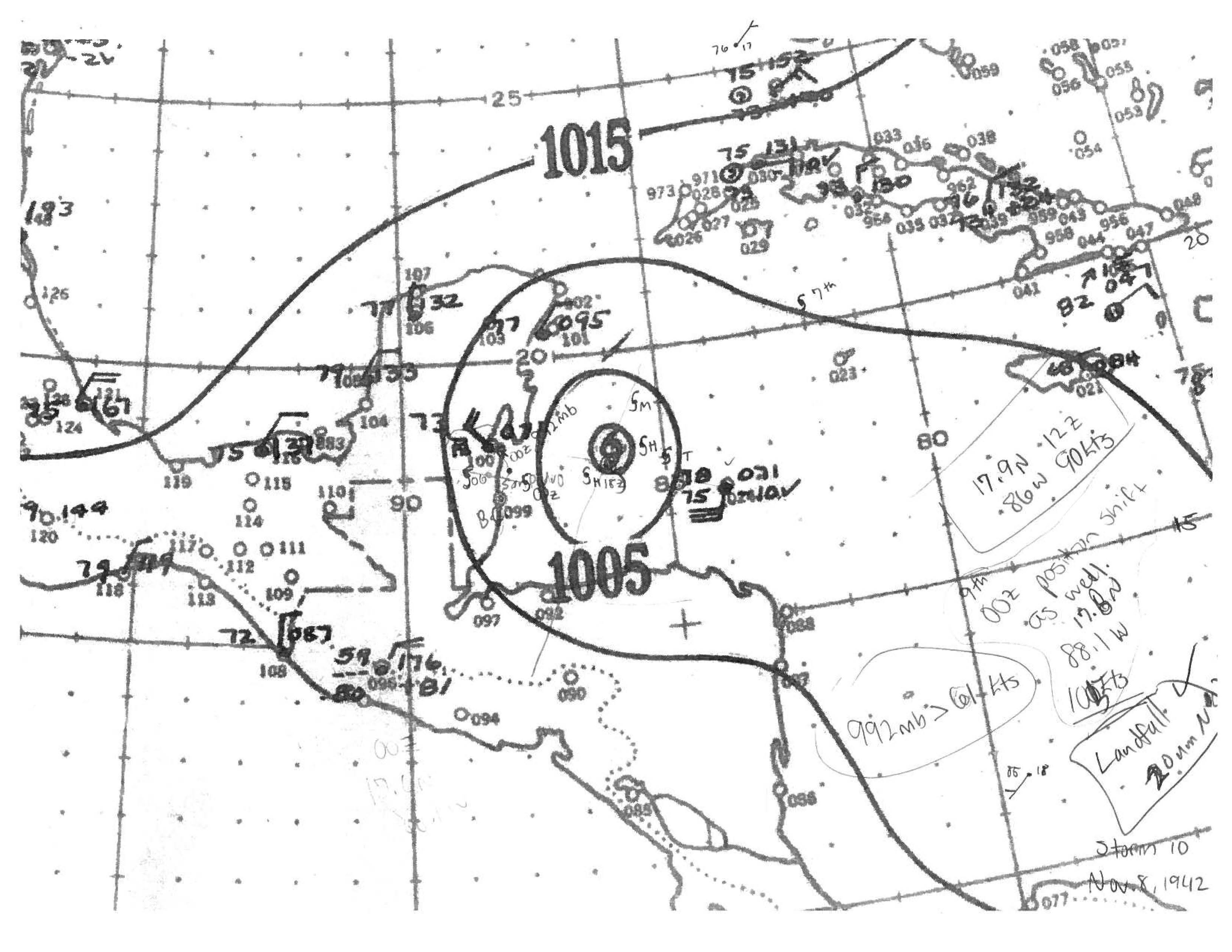
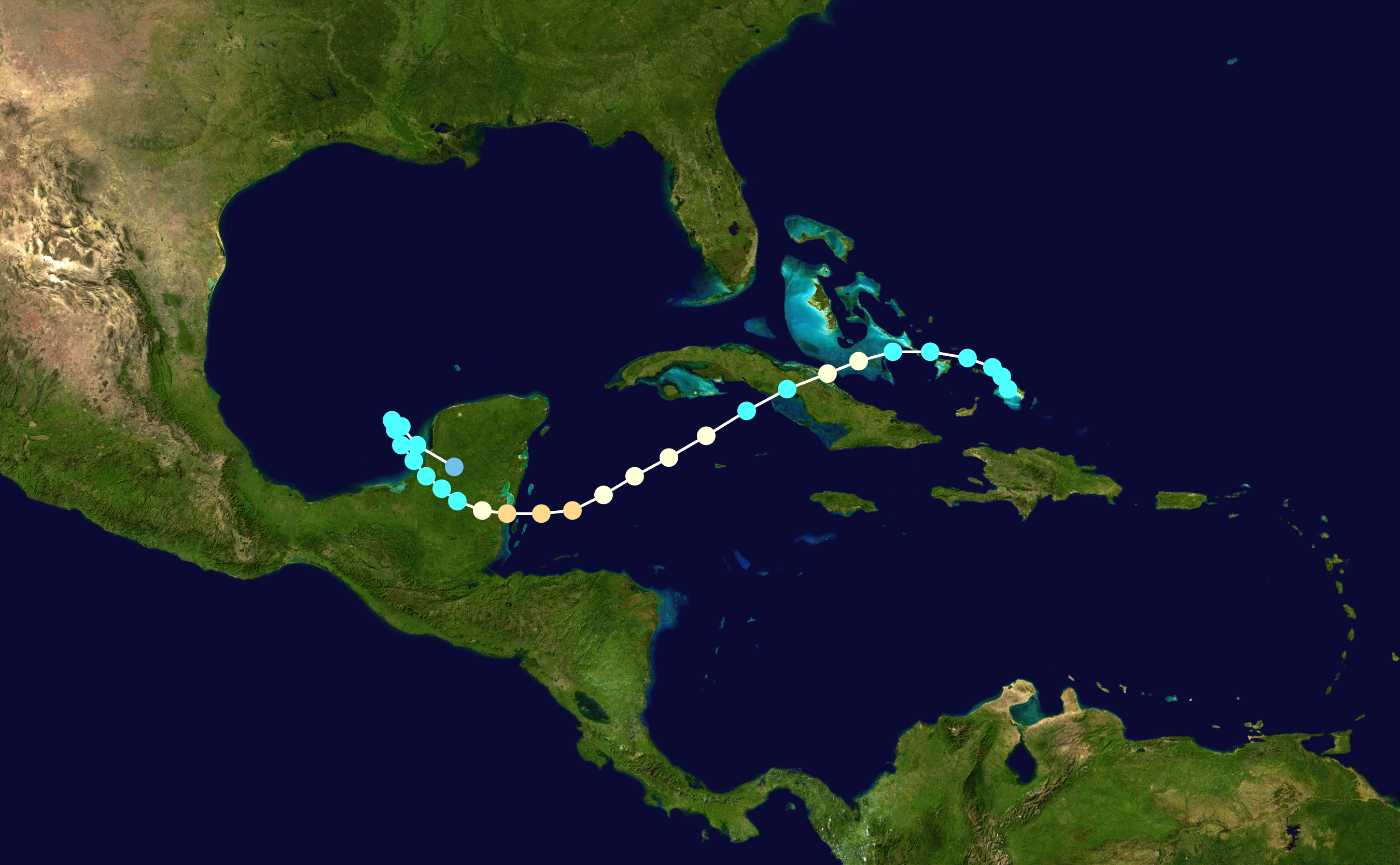
- Duration: November 5 – November 11
- Peak intensity: 110 mph (175 km/h) (1-min); 992 mbar (hPa)

A tropical wave developed into a tropical depression over the Turks and Caicos Islands on November 5. The cyclone strengthened slowly while moving westward and then south-southwestward across the Bahamas. On November 6, the storm became a Category 1 hurricane. Later that day, it made landfall in Cuba near Cayo Romano, Camagüey Province, with winds of 80 mph (130 km/h). Impact in Cuba and the Bahamas was generally limited to lower barometric pressure readings and strong winds. While crossing Cuba, the system weakened to a tropical storm early on November 7, shortly before emerging into the Caribbean Sea. The storm re-strengthened into a hurricane later that day and headed southwestward.

Late on November 8, the hurricane curved westward and intensified into a Category 2 hurricane. Six hours later, it peaked with maximum sustained winds of 110 mph (175 km/h). Early on November 9, the storm struck Caye Caulker and northern Belize District. Rapidly weakening, the system fell to tropical storm status within 12 hours of landfall. By early on November 10, it emerged into the Bay of Campeche. The storm meandered erratically until striking the Yucatán Peninsula on November 11 and dissipating hours later. Strong winds were observed in Belize and Mexico's Yucatán Peninsula. Severe damage was reported in the former. About 90% of structures in San Pedro Town were destroyed, while Newtown was obliterated, causing its residents to relocate and establish the village of Hopkins. Trees and crops such as coconuts also suffered heavy losses. Overall, nine deaths and approximately $4 million in damage were reported.

=== Other systems ===
In addition to the 11 tropical storms, 2 other systems that remained below tropical storm intensity developed. The first such system developed from a low-pressure area over the eastern Gulf of Mexico on June 3. The depression moved rapidly northwestward toward Louisiana, before transitioning into an extratropical cyclone by the following day. A barometric pressure of 1,006 mbar (29.7 inHg) was observed in Lake Charles, Louisiana, while a sustained wind speed of 30 mph (48 km/h) was recorded in Apalachicola, Florida. On October 15, a tropical depression formed just east of the Lesser Antilles. The depression moved northward and avoided landfall in the islands. The depression dissipated by October 18.

== See also ==
- 1942 Pacific hurricane season
- 1942 Pacific typhoon season
- 1900–1950 South-West Indian Ocean cyclone seasons
- 1940s Australian region cyclone seasons
- 1940s South Pacific cyclone seasons
