= 1942 Belize hurricane =

Category 2 Atlantic hurricane in 1942

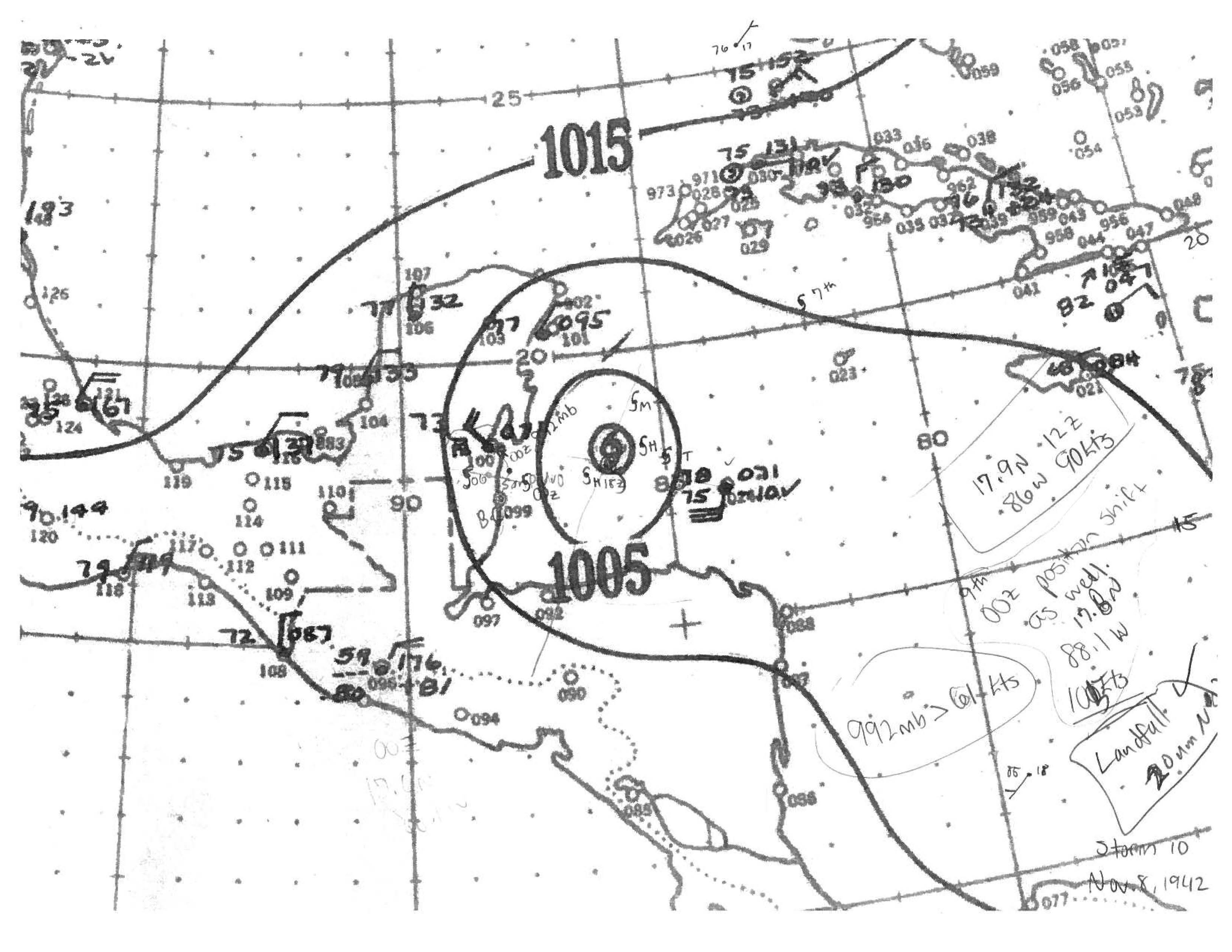
- Surface analysis map of the hurricane on November 8

Meteorological history
- Formed: November 5, 1942
- Dissipated: November 11, 1942

Category 2 hurricane
- 1-minute sustained (SSHWS/NWS)
- Highest winds: 110 mph (175 km/h)
- Lowest pressure: 991 mbar (hPa); 29.26 inHg

Overall effects
- Fatalities: 9
- Damage: $4 million (1942 USD)
- Areas affected: Bahamas, Belize, Cuba
- IBTrACS
- Part of the 1942 Atlantic hurricane season

The 1942 Belize hurricane was one of only two known hurricanes to strike Belize in the month of November, alongside Hurricane Lisa in 2022. The thirteenth observed tropical cyclone, eleventh tropical storm, and fourth hurricane of the 1942 Atlantic hurricane season, this storm was detected in the vicinity of Turks and Caicos Islands on November 5. Initially a tropical storm, it strengthened slowly while moving westward and then south-southwestward across the Bahamas. On November 6, the storm became a Category 1 hurricane on the modern day Saffir–Simpson hurricane wind scale. Later that day, it made landfall in Cayo Romano, Camagüey Province, Cuba. Impact in Cuba and the Bahamas was limited to lower barometric pressure readings and strong winds. While crossing Cuba, the system weakened to a tropical storm early on November 7, shortly before emerging into the Caribbean Sea. The storm re-strengthened into a hurricane later that day and headed southwestward.

Late on November 8, this system curved westward and intensified into a Category 2 hurricane. Six hours later, it peaked with winds of 110 mph (175 km/h). Early on November 9, the storm struck Caye Caulker and northern Belize District. Rapidly weakening, the system fell to tropical storm status within 12 hours of landfall. By early on November 10, it emerged into the Bay of Campeche. The storm meandered erratically until striking the Yucatán Peninsula on November 11 and dissipating hours later. Strong winds were observed in Belize and Mexico's Yucatan Peninsula. Severe damage was reported in the former. About 90% of structures in San Pedro Town were destroyed, while Newtown was obliterated, causing its residents to relocate and establish the village of Hopkins. Trees and crops such as coconuts also suffered heavy losses. Overall, nine deaths and approximately $4 million (1942 USD) in damage were reported. (Note: All damage totals are in 1942 United States dollars unless otherwise noted.)

== Meteorological history ==
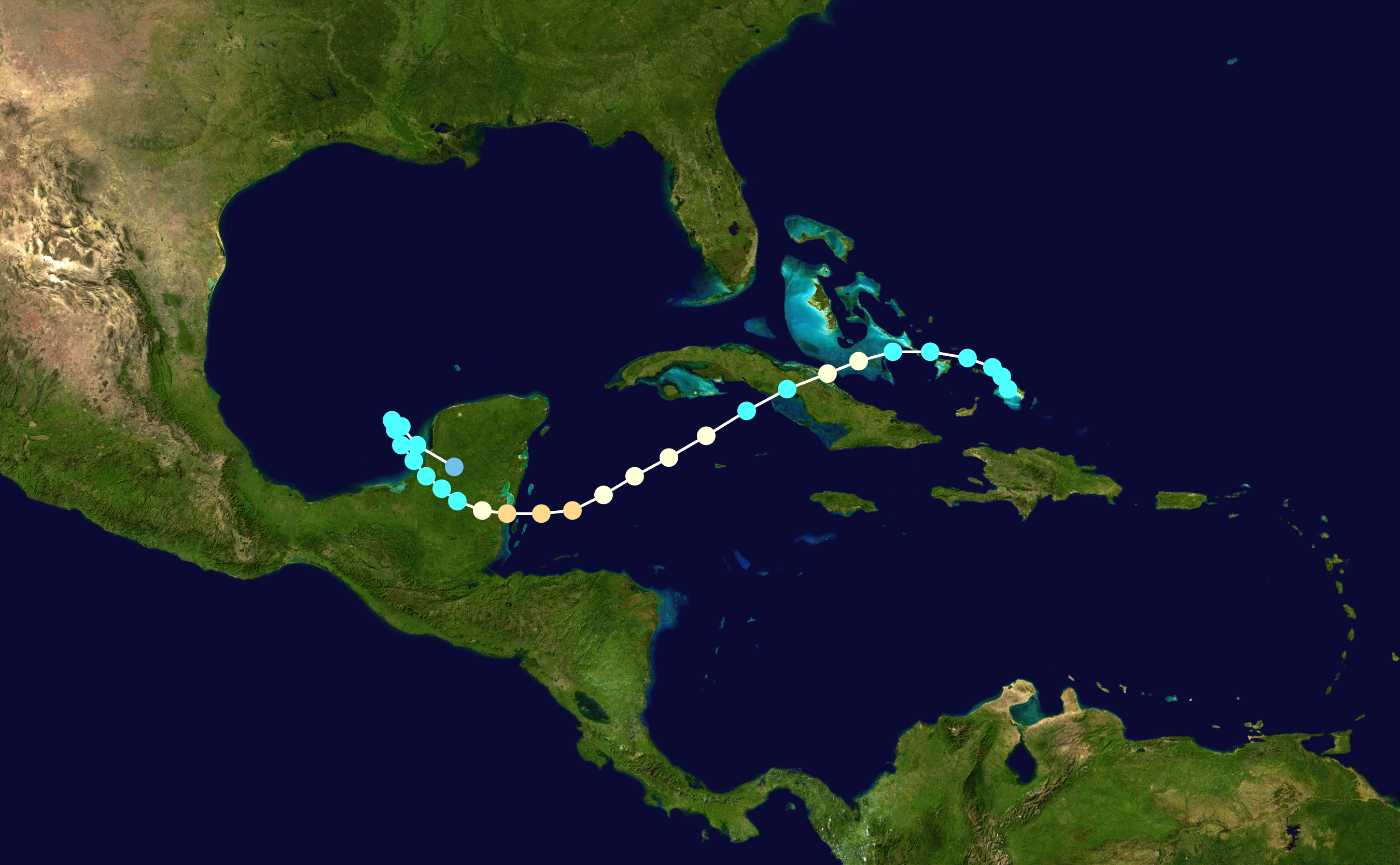
Map plotting the storm's track and intensity, according to the Saffir–Simpson scale Map key Saffir–Simpson scale Tropical depression (≤38 mph, ≤62 km/h) Tropical storm (39–73 mph, 63–118 km/h) Category 1 (74–95 mph, 119–153 km/h) Category 2 (96–110 mph, 154–177 km/h) Category 3 (111–129 mph, 178–208 km/h) Category 4 (130–156 mph, 209–251 km/h) Category 5 (≥157 mph, ≥252 km/h) Unknown Storm type Tropical cyclone Subtropical cyclone Extratropical cyclone, remnant low, tropical disturbance, or monsoon depression

A tropical wave moved through the West Indies between November 3 and November 4. The wave reached the vicinity of Turks and Caicos Islands on November 5, where it developed into a tropical storm at 0000 UTC. The storm moved north-northwestward and then westward across the southern Bahamas. A ridge aloft blocked the storm's westward progress and caused it to re-curve west-southwestward on November 6. The system strengthened into a Category 1 hurricane at 1200 UTC on the modern day Saffir–Simpson hurricane wind scale. Around 1800 UTC on November 6, the storm made landfall on Cayo Romano in Camagüey Province with winds of 80 mph (130 km/h). The system quickly weakened while crossing the mountainous terrain of Cuba and fell to tropical storm intensity early on November 7, shortly before emerging into the northwestern Caribbean Sea. Later that day, the storm re-intensified into a Category 1 hurricane and continued on a southwestward path.

Around midday on November 8, the storm curved westward while approaching Belize and strengthened into a Category 2 hurricane. Shortly thereafter, the hurricane attained its maximum sustained wind speed of 110 mph (175 km/h); this may be a conservative assessment, as it is possible the storm strengthened into a major hurricane, but there was no conclusive data. (Note: A major hurricane is a storm that ranks as Category 3 or higher on the Saffir–Simpson hurricane scale.) This storm was the only known hurricane to strike Belize in the month of November. At about 0000 UTC on November 9, the storm struck Caye Caulker and then northern Belize District at the same intensity. An observatory in Belize City recorded a barometric pressure of 991 mbar (29.3 inHg) – the lowest in association with this storm. The storm rapidly weakened inland and fell to tropical storm intensity by 1200 UTC on November 9. It then curved northwestward, reaching the Bay of Campeche early on November 10. The storm drifted erratically to the west of the Yucatán Peninsula and eventually curved southeastward. Around 1200 UTC on November 11, the system made another landfall near Campeche, Campeche with winds of 45 mph (75 km/h). Less than six hours later, the storm weakened to a tropical depression and dissipated shortly thereafter.

== Impact ==
In the Bahamas, a barometric pressure reading of 997 mbar (29.4 inHg) and force 9 sustained winds on the Beaufort scale were observed on at Georgetown on Exuma. No damage was reported in that country. Strong winds were reported in some areas of Cuba. Cayo Paredon Grande in Camagüey Province recorded sustained winds of 70 mph (110 km/h), while the city of Camagüey observed wind gusts up to 46 mph (74 km/h). In Mexico, the storm struck the Gulf Coast of the Yucatan Peninsula near Campeche, Campeche, where wind gust of force 9 on the Beaufort scare were observed. In Quintana Roo, damaged vegetation fueled a large forest fire.

Although the storm's intensity was equivalent to a Category 2 hurricane, sustained winds in Belize reached only 54 mph (87 km/h). Damage from the hurricane was mainly limited to an area along the coast about 100 miles (160 km) north to south and 40 to 50 miles (64 to 80 km) east to west. In San Pedro Town, about 90% of structures were destroyed. Newtown was completely demolished, causing its resident to establish the city of Hopkins further south. At Ambergris Caye, many houses and coconut plantations were damaged or destroyed. This forced many laborers and coconut plantation owners to seek new professions; most of them entered the fishing industry. Nine deaths were reported, though the toll may have been higher, as numerous small fishing boats were beached or swept out to sea. Widespread damage to vegetation and trees occurred. An assessment of damage after the storm indicated that more than 75% of the canopy species had been destroyed. Although the low bush was not badly damaged, about 25% to 50% of the pine trees were toppled. Damage on deep soils was largely from breakage while on shallow soils mostly from wind throw. Tides along the coast split Caye Caulker into three separate islands and swept away "everything in its path". Overall, damage totaled approximately $4 million, with $1 million to private and public property, including buildings and dwellings. The remaining $3 million in damage was incurred to coconuts and other crops; this total possibly includes damage to the mahogany and chicle industries.

== See also ==
- Hurricane Hilda (1955)
- Hurricane Richard
- Hurricane Roxanne
