= 1943 Atlantic hurricane season =

- Season summary map

Seasonal boundaries
- First system formed: July 25, 1943
- Last system dissipated: October 26, 1943

Strongest storm
- Name: Three
  - Maximum winds: 140 mph (220 km/h) (1-minute sustained)

Seasonal statistics
- Total depressions: 11
- Total storms: 10
- Hurricanes: 5
- Major hurricanes (Cat. 3+): 2
- Total fatalities: 20
- Total damage: $17.739 million (1943 USD)

Related articles
- 1942–1948 Pacific hurricane seasons; 1943 Pacific typhoon season; 1940s North Indian Ocean cyclone seasons

The 1943 Atlantic hurricane season marked the first deliberate reconnaissance aircraft flights into tropical cyclones. The season officially lasted from June 16 to October 31, which was, at the time, considered the most likely period for tropical cyclone formation in the Atlantic Ocean. (Note: Currently, the Atlantic hurricane season officially begins on June 1 and ends on November 30.) A total of ten storms from 1943 are listed in the Atlantic hurricane database, and an eleventh system that affected Florida and Georgia has been identified as a probable tropical depression. The first system of the year, dubbed the "Surprise Hurricane", caused severe damage throughout Texas and Louisiana in June, partially because information about its approach was censored in the fray of World War II; the storm caused 19 deaths and $17 million in damage. (Note: All damage totals are in 1943 US$ unless otherwise noted.) A major hurricane in mid-August produced hurricane-force winds in Bermuda, (Note: A major hurricane is a storm that ranks as Category 3 or higher on the Saffir–Simpson scale.) and several other tropical cyclones throughout the year resulted in strong winds there. In September, a hurricane impacted the western Gulf Coast of the United States, then a tropical storm struck the Mid-Atlantic. The two storms resulted in $419,000 and $20,000 in damage, respectively; one death was attributed to the latter system. In mid-October, a strong hurricane resulted in flooding and damage to crops throughout the Caribbean; after becoming post-tropical, it contributed to moderate impacts across Nova Scotia.

The season's activity was reflected with an accumulated cyclone energy (ACE) rating of 94 units, above the 1931–1943 average of 91.2. ACE is a metric used to express the energy used by a tropical cyclone during its lifetime. Therefore, a storm with a longer duration will have high values of ACE. It is only calculated at six-hour increments in which specific tropical and subtropical systems are either at or above sustained wind speeds of 39 mph (63 km/h), which is the threshold for tropical storm intensity. Thus, tropical depressions are not included here.

== Systems ==
=== Hurricane One ===
- Category 2 hurricane (SSHWS)
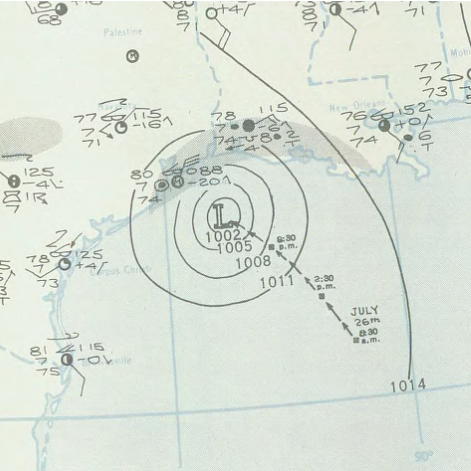
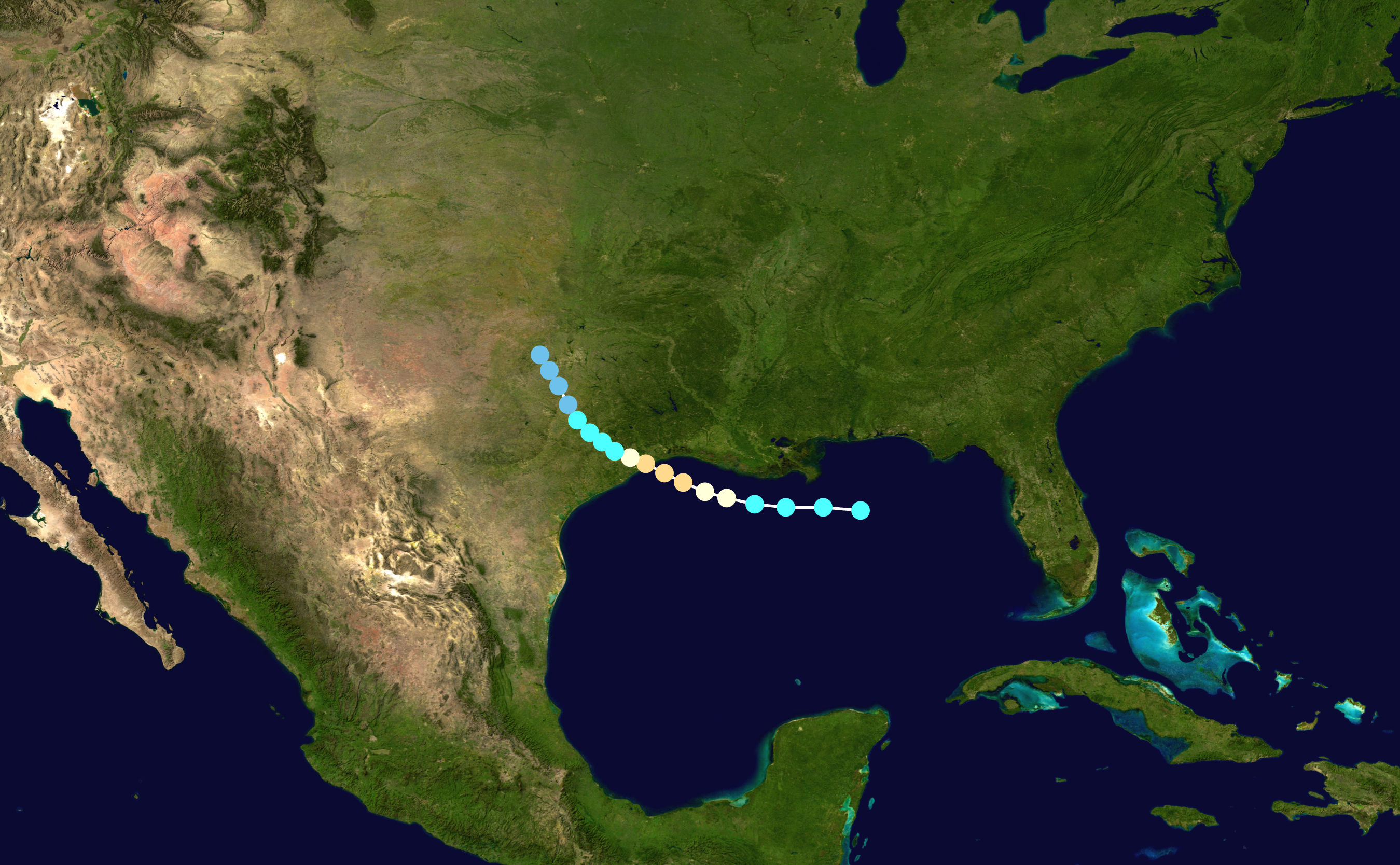
- Duration: July 25 – July 30
- Peak intensity: 105 mph (165 km/h) (1-min); 967 mbar (hPa)

The Surprise Hurricane of 1943

The 1943 Surprise hurricane was the first hurricane to be entered by a reconnaissance aircraft. An area of low pressure was first observed over the Southeastern United States and eastern Gulf of Mexico on July 23. It tracked west-northwest and, in conjunction with surface observations along the Louisiana coastline, was found to have organized into a tropical storm by 18:00 UTC on July 25 while situated about 110 mi (175 km) southeast of the Mississippi Delta. The nascent cyclone rapidly intensified thereafter, attaining hurricane intensity by 18:00 UTC on July 26 and reaching its peak as a Category 2 hurricane with winds of 105 mph (165 km/h) early the following morning. The compact hurricane moved ashore the coastline of Texas near Galveston Bay at 18:00 UTC on July 27, around which time it was intercepted by the first reconnaissance aircraft to intentionally fly into a tropical cyclone. The storm weakened once inland and dissipated about 60 mi (95 km/h) early of the Dallas–Fort Worth metroplex by 00:00 UTC on July 30.

In the fray of World War II, information was censored by the Federal government of the United States across the country, including reports from ships that the Weather Bureau heavily relied upon for hurricane updates. The cyclone that affected the Texas and Louisiana coastlines, therefore, was dubbed the 1943 "Surprise" hurricane. Documentation of the storm's impacts suggests it was the worst since the 1915 Galveston hurricane. Houston Municipal Airport recorded a peak wind gust of 132 mph (212 km/h). Two utility towers over the Houston Ship Channel, built to withstand winds of roughly 120 mph (195 km/h), were toppled. Along the coastline near Texas City, storm surge values were surprisingly light at between 3–6 ft (0.9–1.8 m), but 90% of homes either suffered water damage or were completely destroyed. Rising water from Galveston Bay resulted in flooding throughout the city itself, and a three-story building was collapsed by strong winds. Rainfall across Texas and Louisiana varied, but Devers, Texas, recorded a maximum storm total of 23 in (584 mm). Widespread freshwater flooding occurred in the Beaumont and Port Arthur areas. At Ellington Field Joint Reserve Base, scores of air cadets and soldiers held onto the wings of airplanes to prevent them from going airborne; almost two dozen were injured in the aftermath. Offshore, the hopper dredge Galveston and tugboat Titan were capsized, leading to a total of 15 deaths. Overall, damage from the hurricane reached $17 million, 19 deaths were documented, and hundreds of people were injured. As a result of the casualties, the decision to censor information during an approaching storm was never again repeated.

=== Tropical Storm Two ===
- Tropical storm (SSHWS)
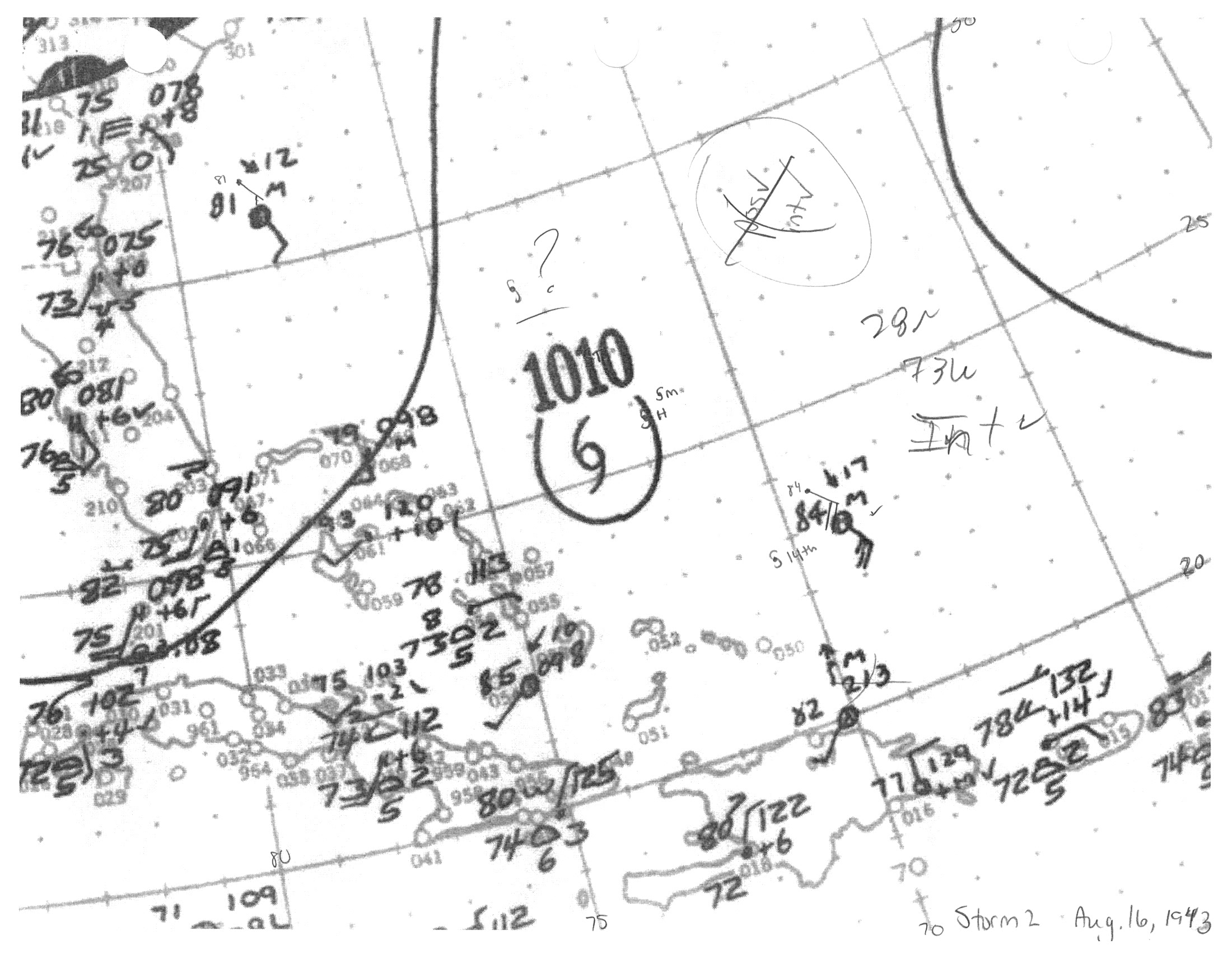
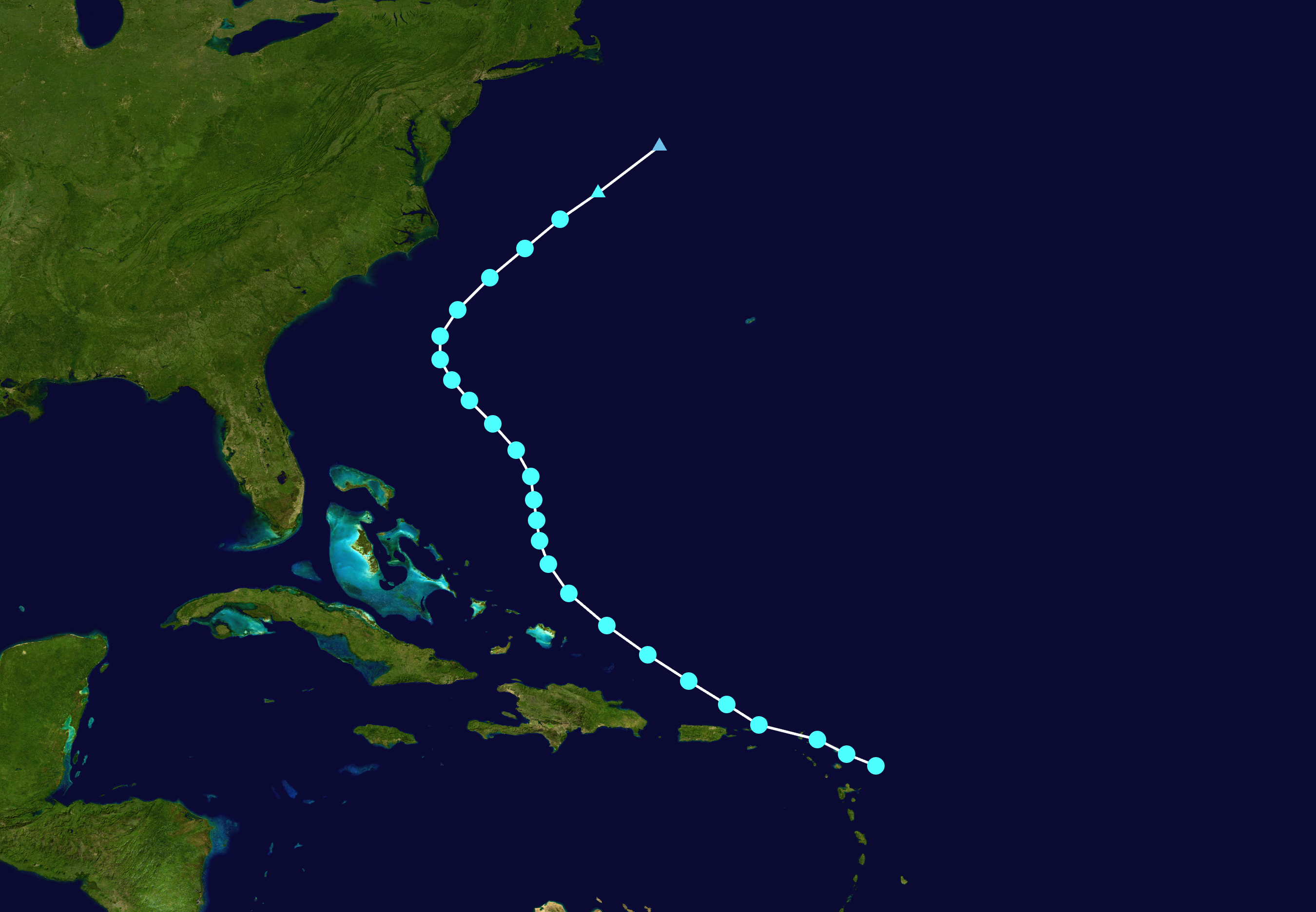
- Duration: August 13 – August 19
- Peak intensity: 60 mph (95 km/h) (1-min); 1005 mbar (hPa)

A minimal tropical storm was first discovered about 80 mi (130 km) east of Antigua and Barbuda around 12:00 UTC on August 13. It passed just north of the Caribbean while on a west-northwest track, reaching peak winds of 60 mph (95 km/h) by early on August 16. It curved northwest the following day before then turning northeast between the East Coast of the United States and Bermuda. The storm steadily lost intensity and transitioned into an extratropical cyclone by 12:00 UTC on August 19, and it was last documented six hours later. In the wake of the 1943 Surprise Hurricane, this was the first tropical cyclone that reconnaissance aircraft flew through and had observations reported back to the Weather Bureau during real-time operations. Early in its duration, the storm dropped rainfall over the Lesser Antilles, with Saint Kitts recording a peak 24-hour total of 3.2 in (81 mm) at La Guerite.

=== Hurricane Three ===
- Category 4 hurricane (SSHWS)
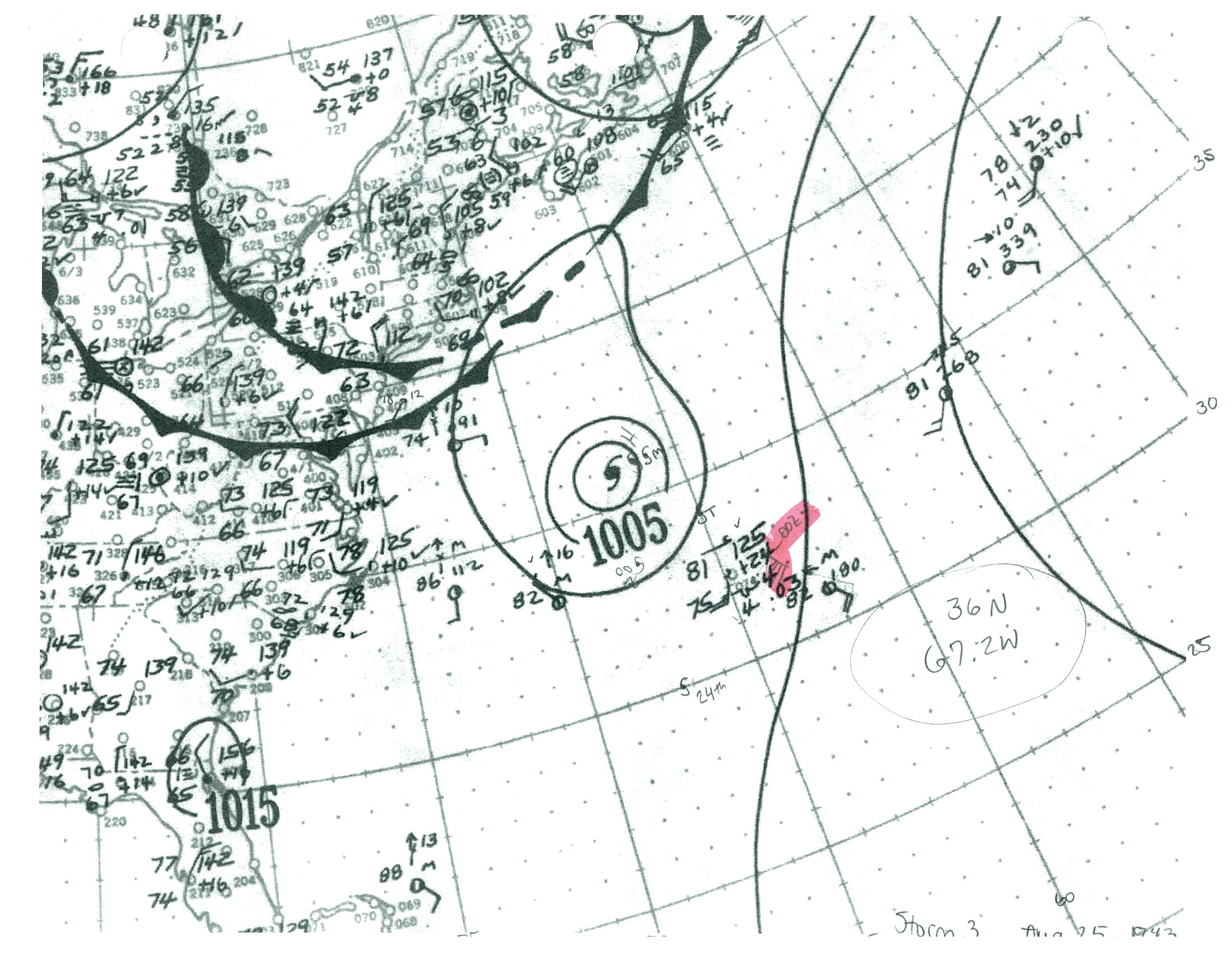
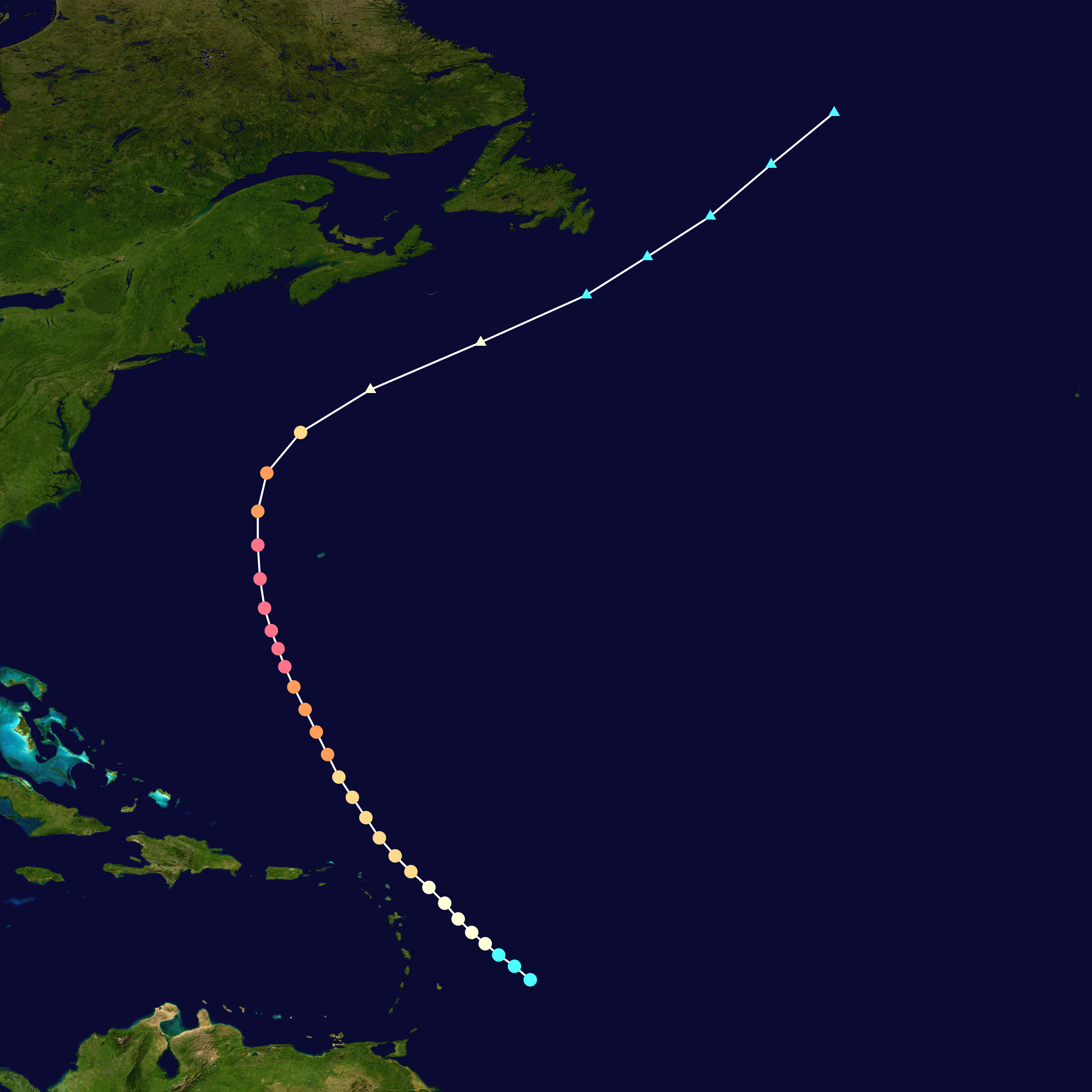
- Duration: August 19 – August 25
- Peak intensity: 140 mph (220 km/h) (1-min);

The third tropical cyclone of the 1943 season was noted about 265 mi (425 km) east of Barbados around 06:00 UTC on August 19. Like its predecessor, the storm steered clear of the Caribbean on its west-northwest course, producing only minor squally weather across the Leeward Islands as it intensified. It became a hurricane around 00:00 UTC on August 20, intensified into the season's first major hurricane by 18:00 UTC on August 22, and further organized to attain its peak intensity as a Category 4 hurricane with winds of 140 mph (220 km/h) around 06:00 UTC on August 24. It curved northeast after passing within 165 mi (265 km) of Bermuda, where winds peaked at 81 mph (130 km/h), interacting with a high-latitude cyclone to become extratropical by 00:00 UTC on August 26. The post-tropical cyclone gradually lost strength and was last noted over the far northern Atlantic.

=== Hurricane Four ===
- Category 3 hurricane (SSHWS)
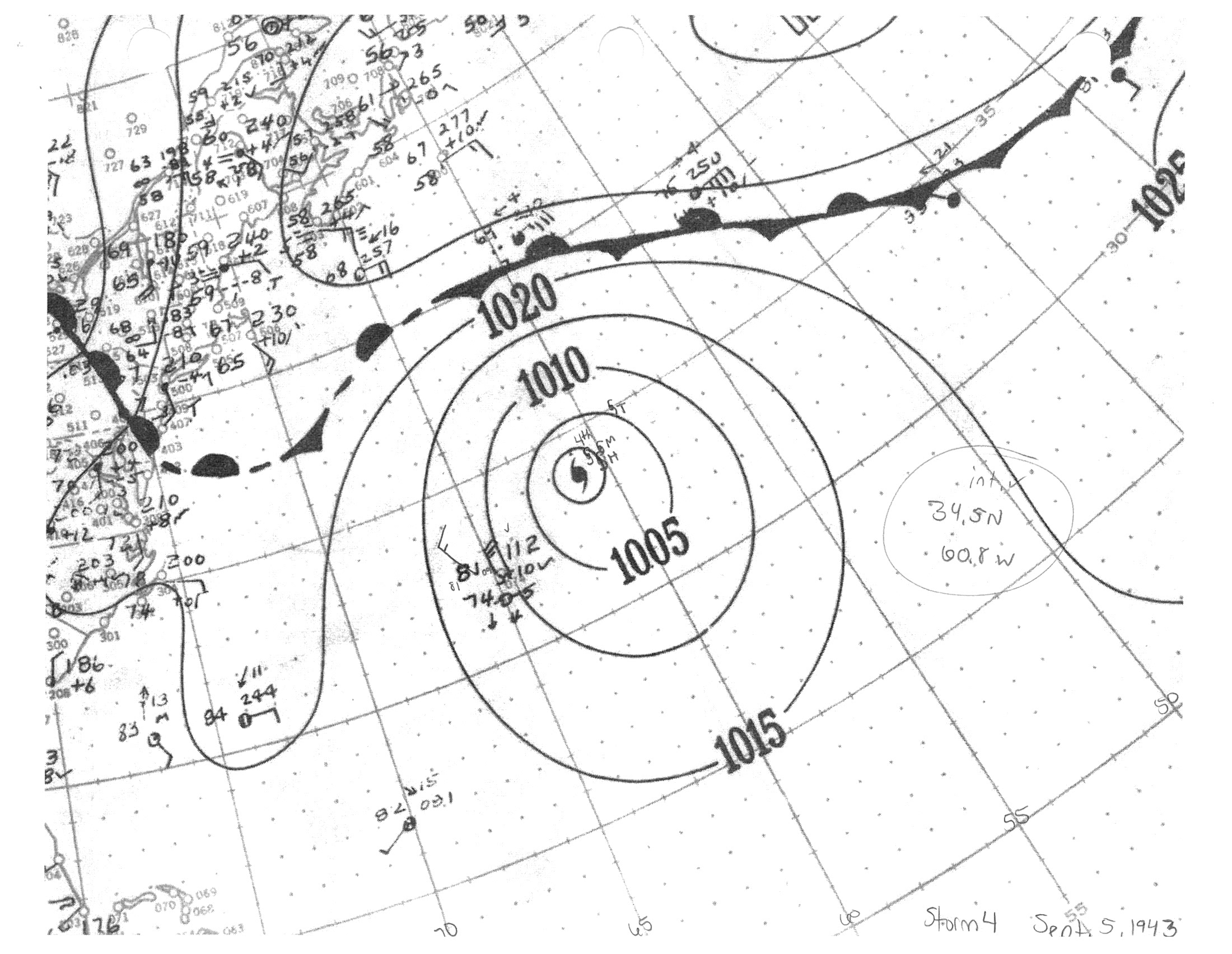
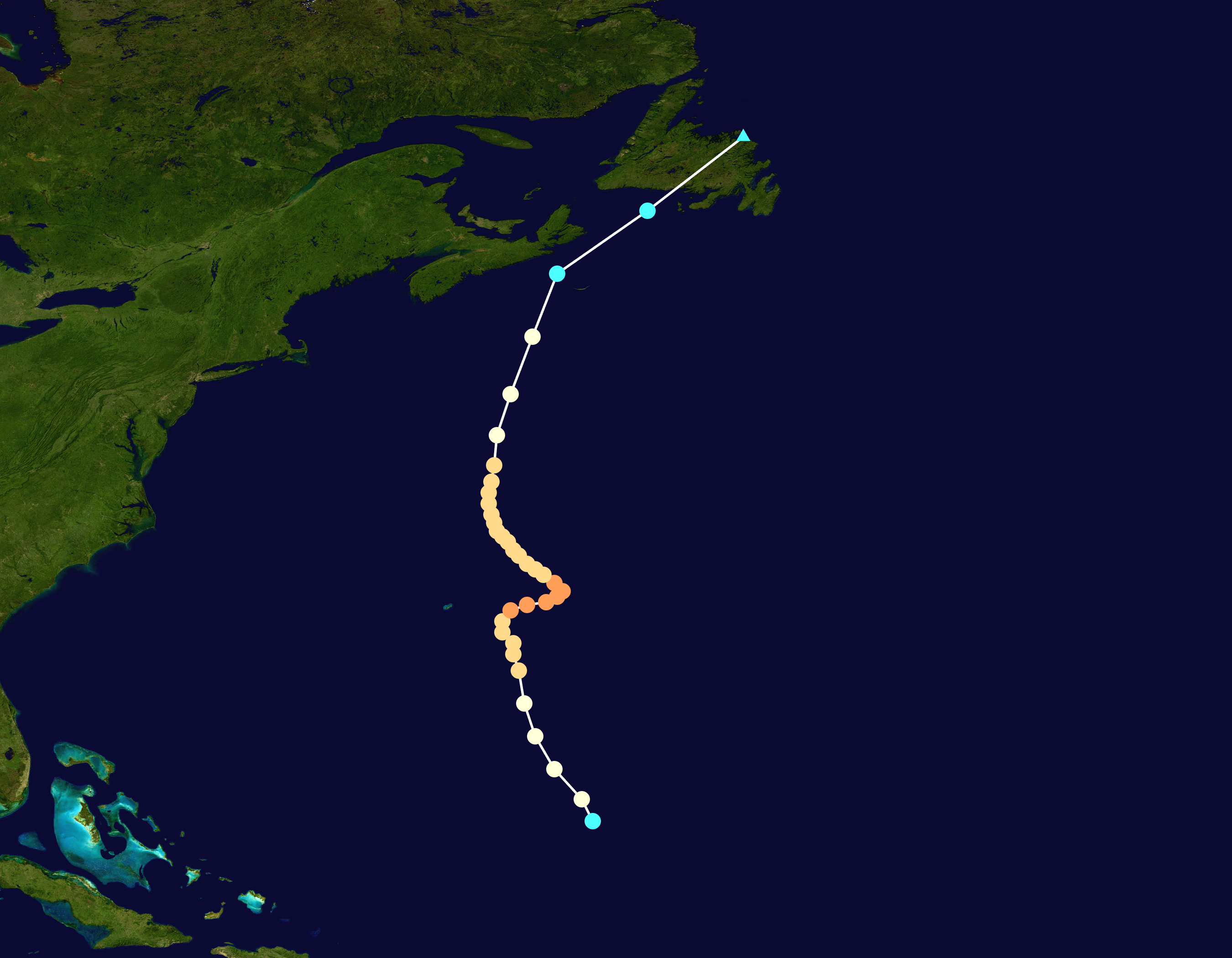
- Duration: September 1 – September 9
- Peak intensity: 120 mph (195 km/h) (1-min);

A few days after the dissipation of Hurricane Three, a new tropical storm on the cusp of hurricane intensity was identified about 630 mi (1,015 km) southeast of Bermuda around 06:00 UTC on September 1. The system steadily strengthened as it moved erratically, attaining peak winds of 120 mph (195 km/h) by 06:00 UTC on September 4. After passing within 120 mi (195 km) of Bermuda, delivering a period of tropical storm-force winds to the island, the hurricane was directed north and then northeast by a developing area of high pressure. It brushed Nova Scotia before moving ashore the southern coastline of Newfoundland, ultimately transitioning into an extratropical cyclone by 00:00 UTC on September 10.

=== Tropical Storm Five ===
- Tropical storm (SSHWS)
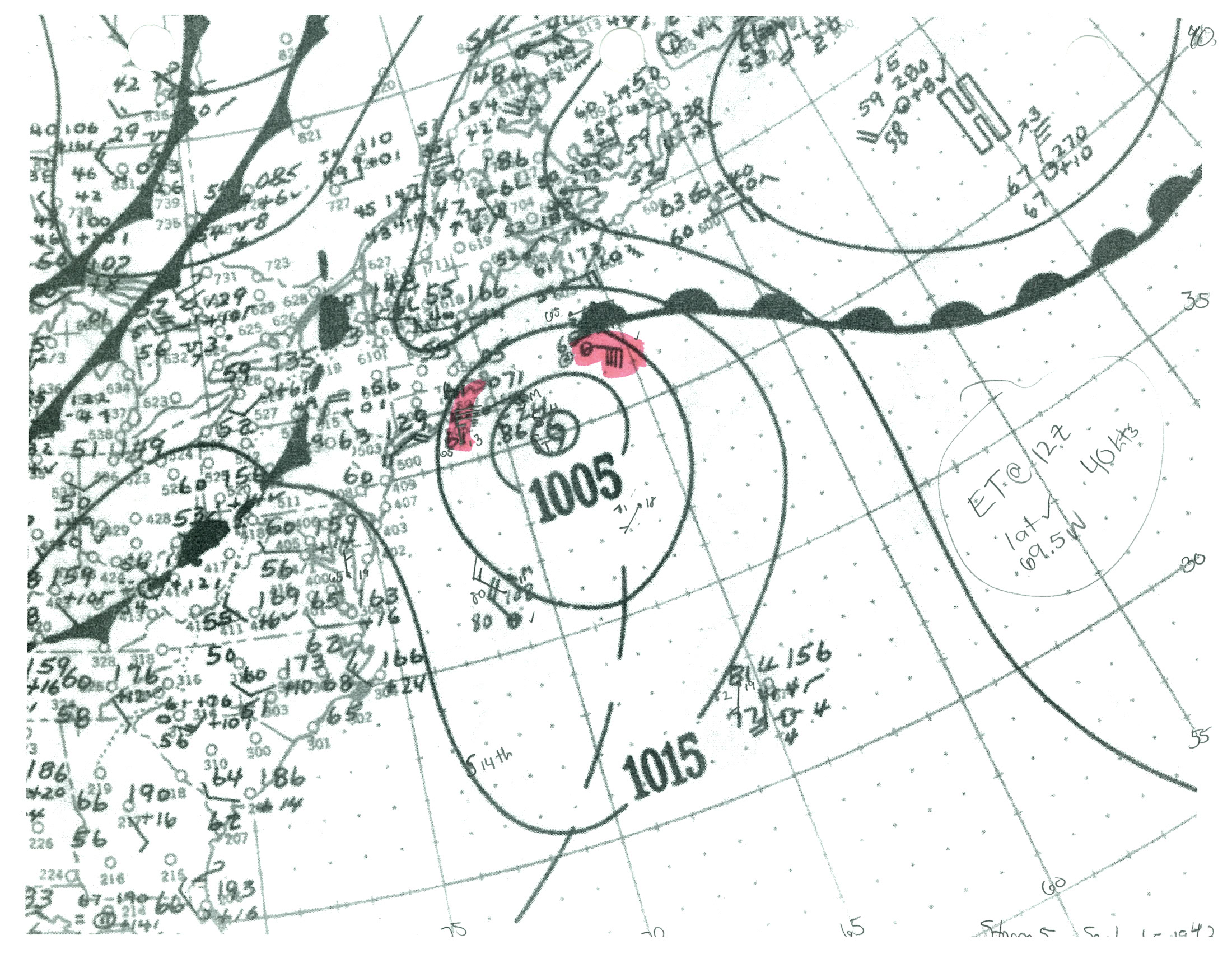
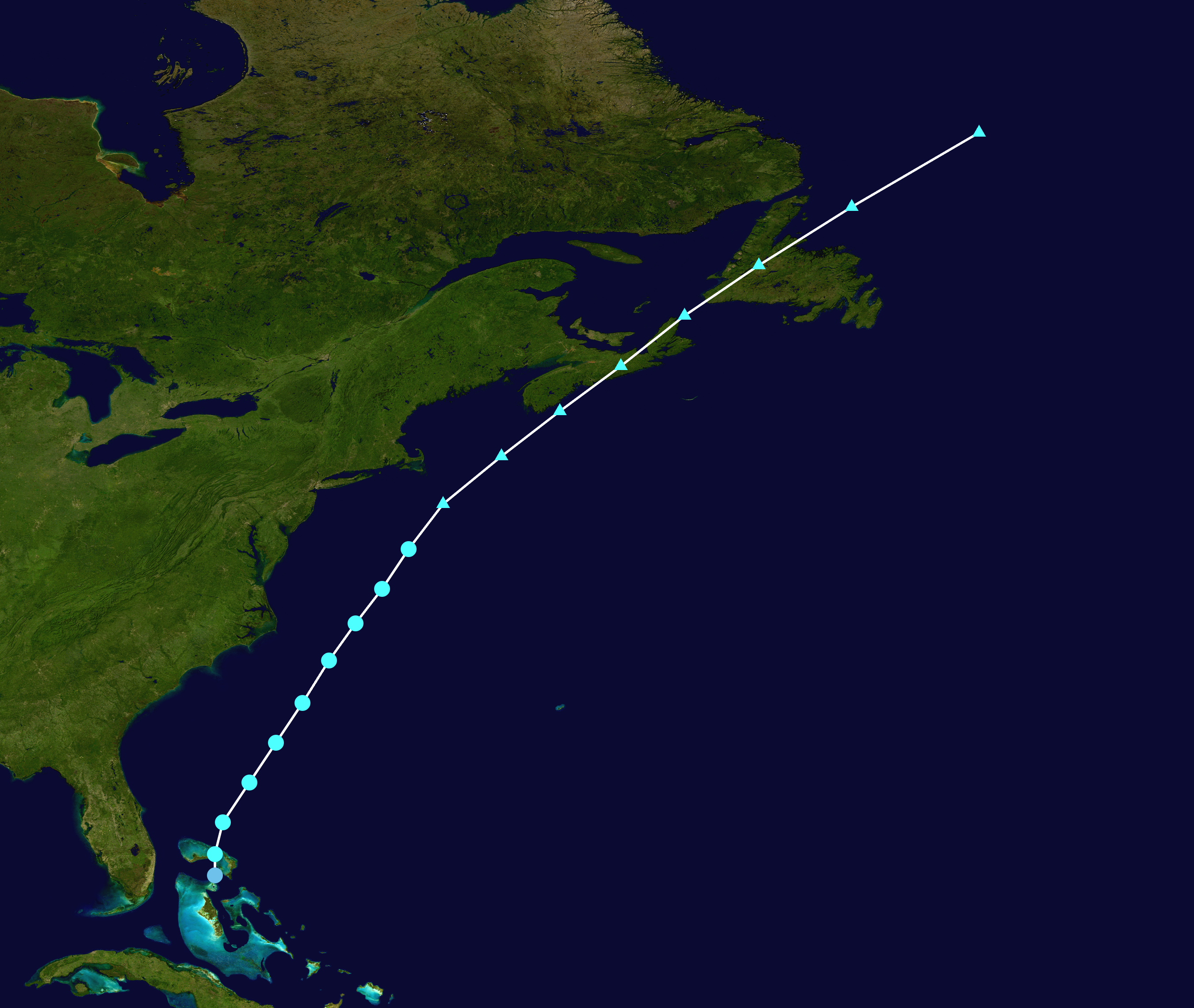
- Duration: September 13 – September 15
- Peak intensity: 50 mph (85 km/h) (1-min); 1005 mbar (hPa)

The northern end of a trough developed into a tropical depression just north of the Berry Islands in The Bahamas around 00:00 UTC on September 13. It attained tropical storm intensity six hours later and attained peak winds of 50 mph (85 km/h) by 18:00 UTC as it moved north-northeast. The cyclone lost tropical characteristics by 12:00 UTC on September 15 while positioned about 95 mi (155 km) south-southeast of Nantucket and subsequently tracked across Nova Scotia and Newfoundland. It was last observed over the northern Atlantic on September 17. Impacts from the storm were relegated to heavy rainfall along the shores of Nantucket, "extraordinarily high tides" northeast from Cape Cod, as well as gale-force winds and 1.2 in (30 mm) of rainfall from the post-tropical cyclone within Nova Scotia.

=== Hurricane Six ===
- Category 2 hurricane (SSHWS)
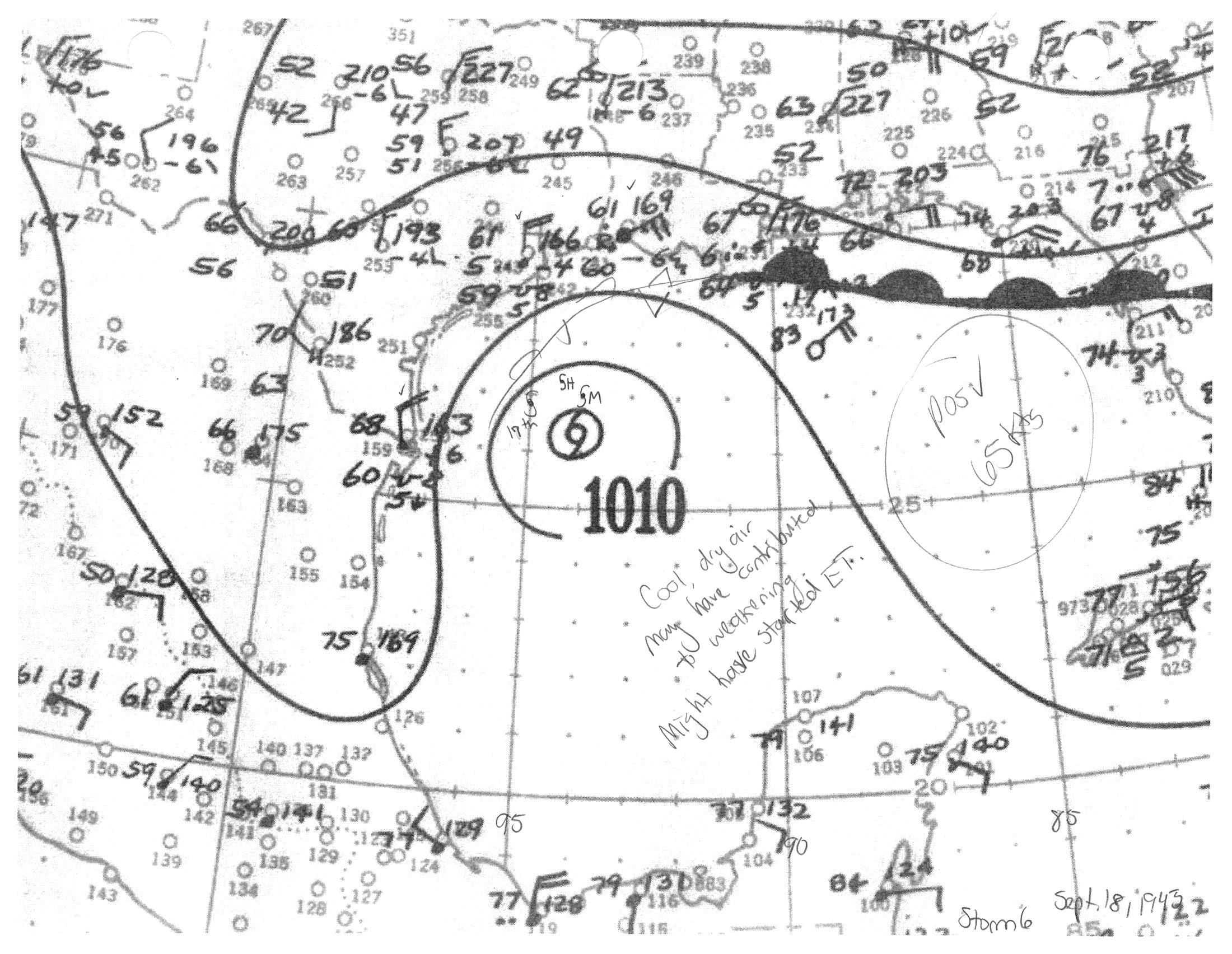
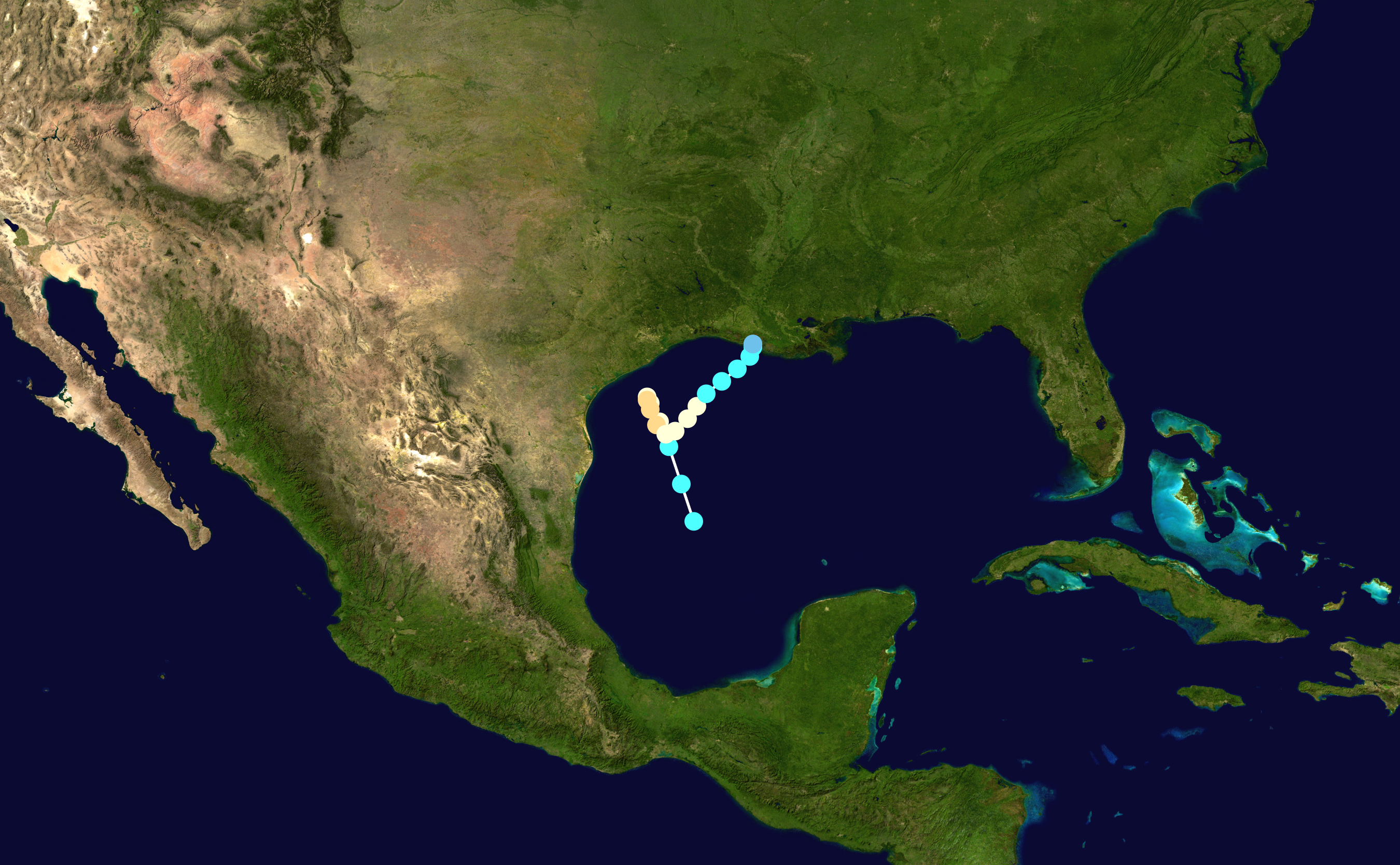
- Duration: September 15 – September 20
- Peak intensity: 100 mph (155 km/h) (1-min);

A circulation aloft was first documented across the western Gulf of Mexico on September 12. It became evident in surface maps three days later, marking the formation of a tropical storm by 18:00 UTC about 270 mi (435 km) southeast of Matamoros, Tamaulipas. The nascent cyclone tracked northwest and attained hurricane intensity on September 16 before reaching its peak as a Category 2 hurricane with winds of 100 mph (160 km/h) the following morning. Thereafter, an area of high pressure over the northern High Plains forced the system to complete a counter-clockwise loop. It turned northeast and steadily weakened before reaching the southern coastline of Louisiana as a tropical depression by 12:00 UTC on September 20.

As a tropical cyclone, the system produced tropical storm-force winds along a wide stretch of the Texas coastline, peaking at 62 mph (100 km/h) in Freeport. A tide of 4.5 ft (1.4 m) was also recorded there. About five percent of the rice crop in Jefferson County was ruined, while buildings were damaged around Galveston. Farther east, much of southern Mississippi and Louisiana received between 5–10 in (127–254 mm) of rainfall, peaking at 19 in (482 mm) in Morgan City, Louisiana. The combination of heavy precipitation and backwater flooding led to 3–5 ft (0.9–1.5 m) of inundation just south of Raceland. Levees in False Bayou came within inches of overflowing, forcing numerous families to higher grounds. Total damage along the coastline reached $419,000.

=== Tropical Storm Seven ===
- Tropical storm (SSHWS)
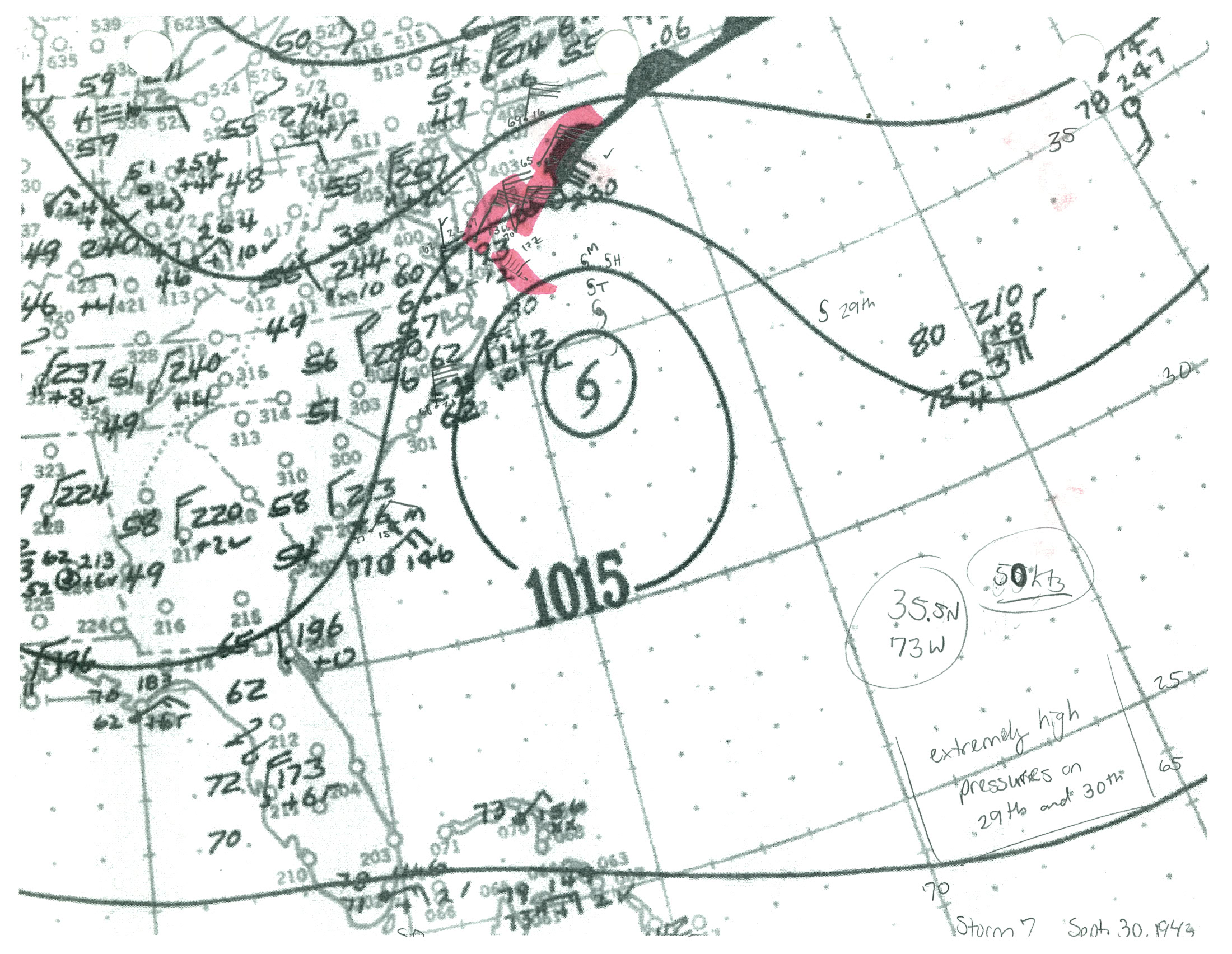
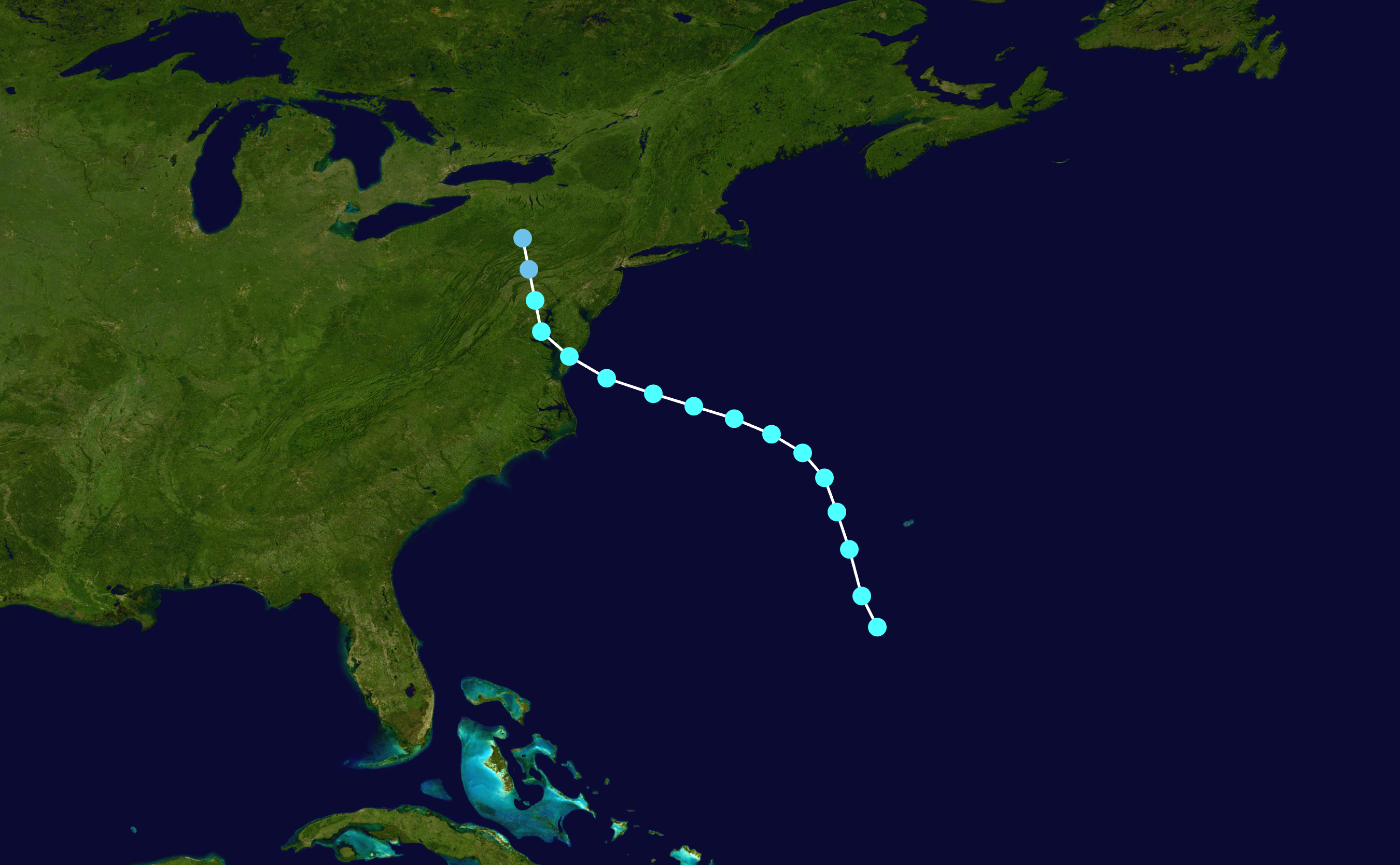
- Duration: September 28 – October 1
- Peak intensity: 65 mph (100 km/h) (1-min); 997 mbar (hPa)

A tropical wave ascended to tropical storm status by 06:00 UTC on September 28 while located about 230 mi (370 km) south of Bermuda. It moved northwest and then west-northwest, steadily organizing to attain peak winds of 65 mph (100 km/h) early on September 30. The storm then moved ashore the central coast of Maryland and was last distinguishable near Williamsport, Pennsylvania, around 00:00 UTC on October 2. Considerable damage to crops, and lesser damage to structures, was inflicted throughout the Norfolk and Cape Charles, Virginia, areas, with damage estimated at $20,000. Rainfall was generally light, peaking at 4.6 in (117 mm) in Diamond Springs, but did result in some street flooding. A small ship and several small boats were sunk. Atlantic City, New Jersey, reported a maximum gust of 70 mph (113 km/h), and only slightly weaker gusts were recorded throughout Virginia. One death was reported.

=== Tropical Storm Eight ===
- Tropical storm (SSHWS)
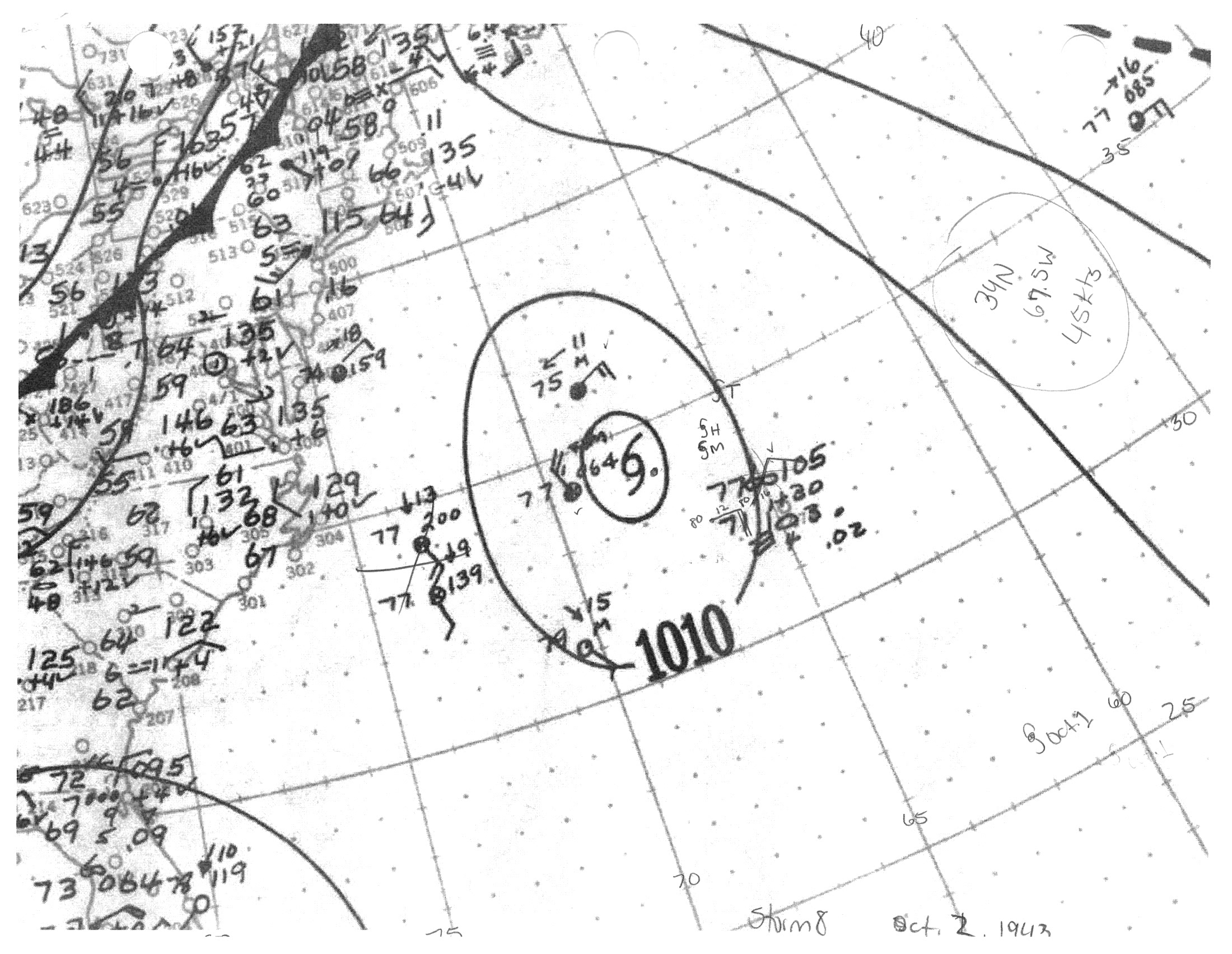
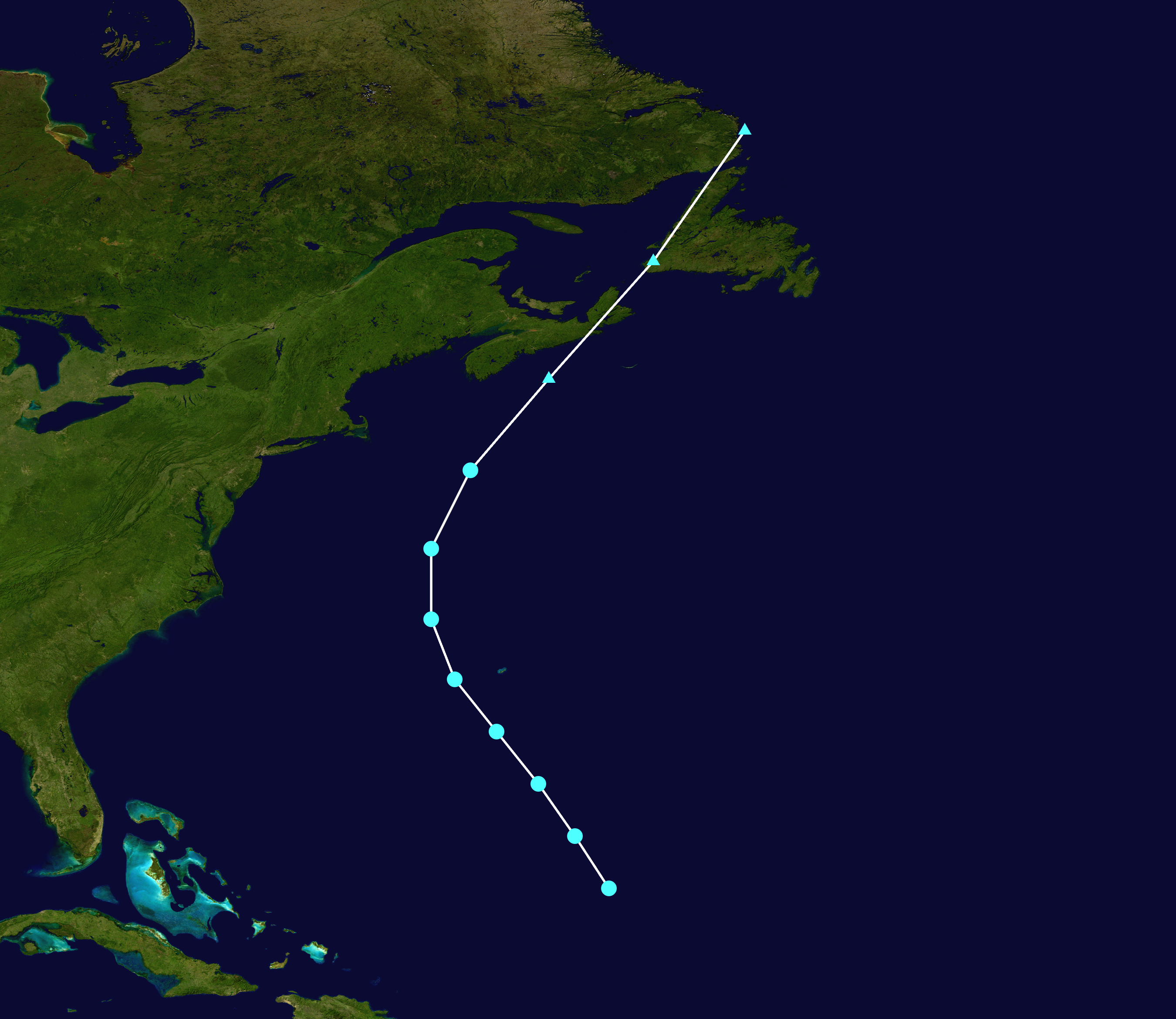
- Duration: October 1 – October 3
- Peak intensity: 70 mph (110 km/h) (1-min); 999 mbar (hPa)

On the first day of October, a strong tropical storm with winds of 70 mph (110 km/h) was observed about 620 mi (1,000 km) southeast of Bermuda, where winds near gale-force were later observed. No further intensification occurred as the cyclone moved northwest and then curved northeast, and it transitioned into an extratropical cyclone by 06:00 UTC on October 3. The system crossed Nova Scotia and Newfoundland before entering the far northern Atlantic.

=== Hurricane Nine ===
- Category 2 hurricane (SSHWS)
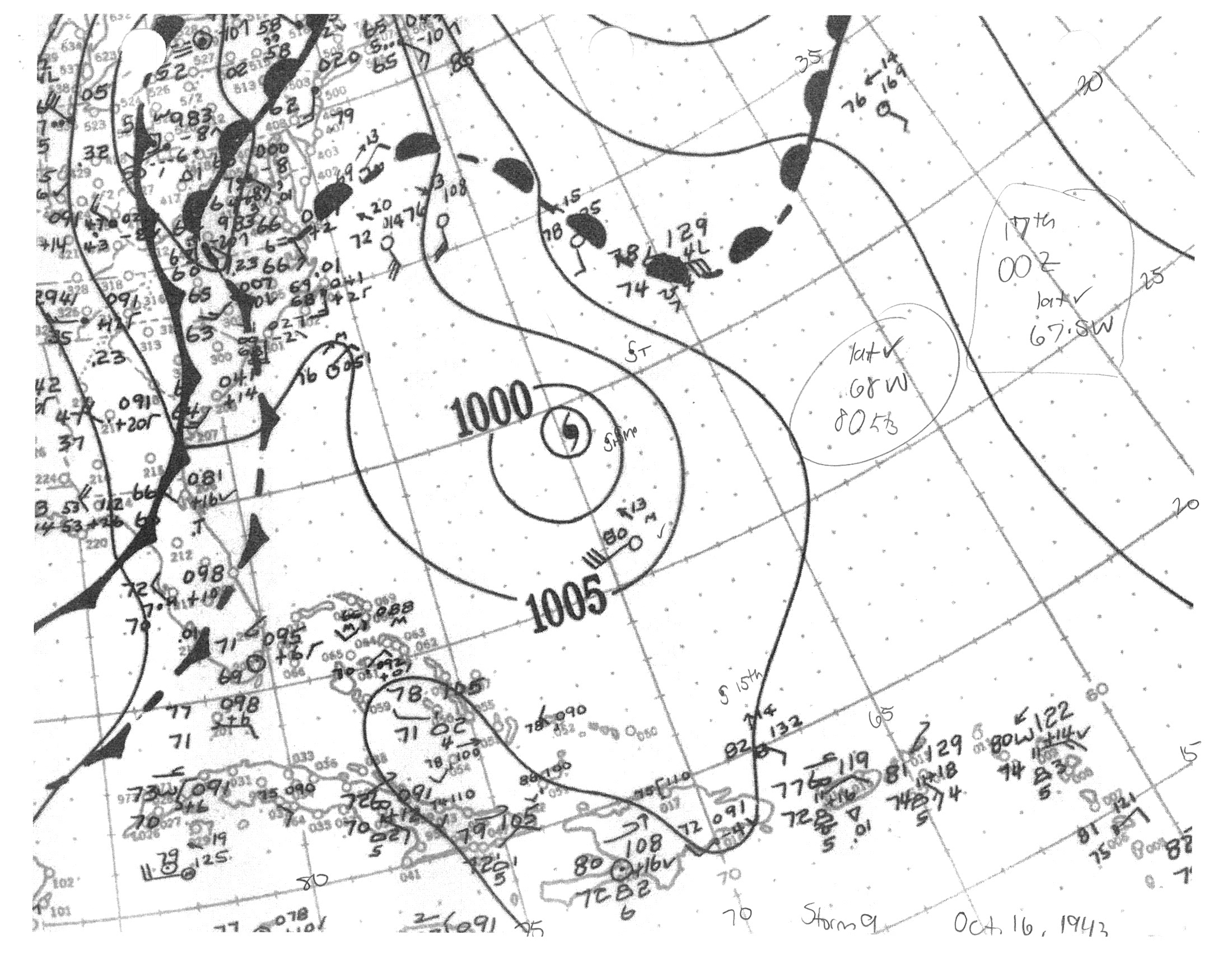
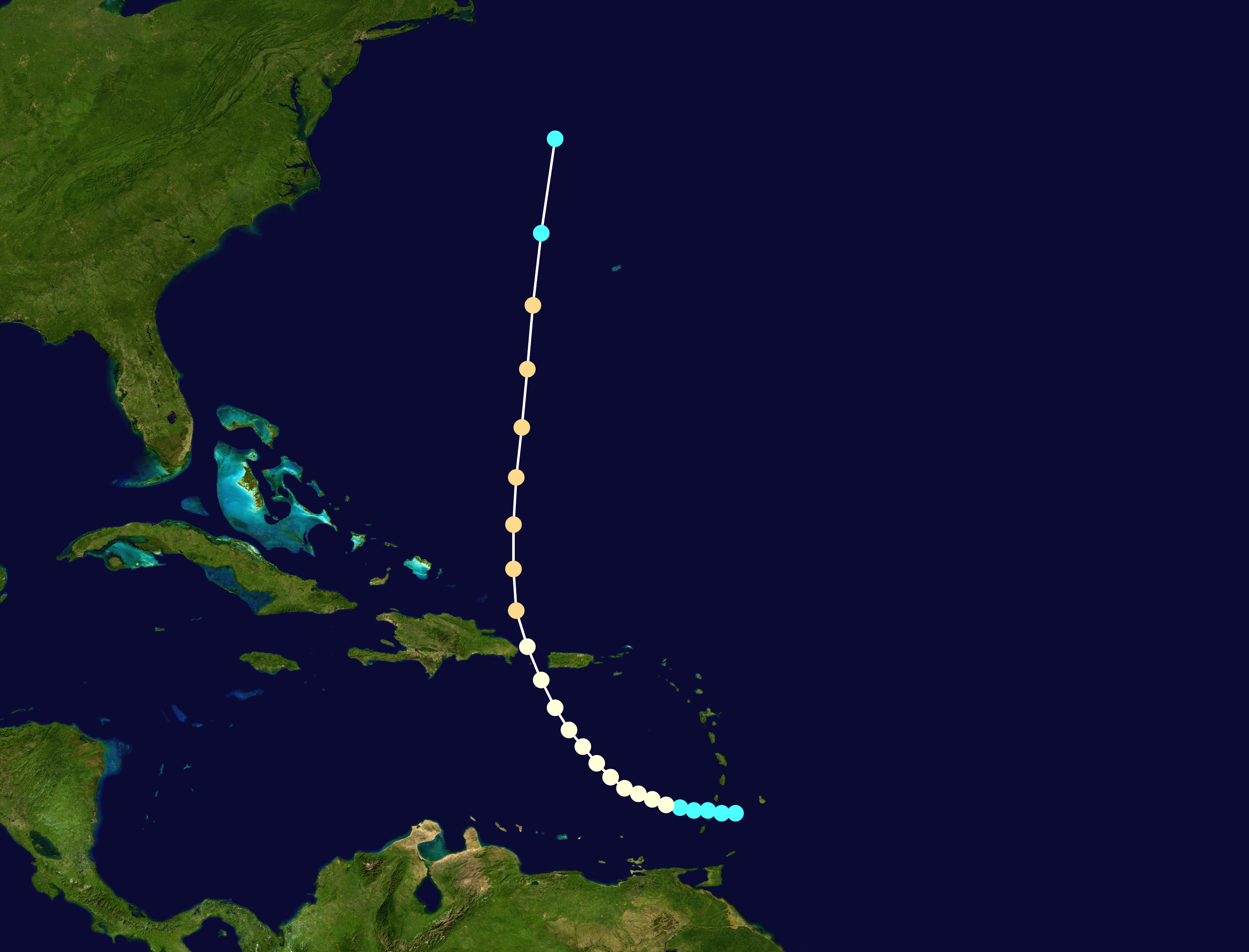
- Duration: October 11 – October 17
- Peak intensity: 110 mph (175 km/h) (1-min);

Hurricane San Calixto of 1943
A tropical storm was documented passing through the Windward Islands into the Caribbean Sea early on October 11. It intensified into a hurricane by 12:00 UTC the next morning, whereupon it began a curve toward the north. The cyclone passed through the Mona Passage and attained its peak a Category 2 hurricane with winds of 110 mph (175 km/h) shortly thereafter. Passing within 180 mi (290 km) of Bermuda, it produced winds around tropical storm-force there before it was last documented over the northwestern Atlantic early on October 17.

As the cyclone entered the Caribbean Sea, it produced maximum winds of 40–50 mph (64–80 km/h) in Saint Lucia. Puerto Rico recorded winds near 60 mph (97 km/h) which unroofed houses. Heavy rainfall, peaking at 17.6 in (447 mm) in Toro Negro, led to flooding in several communities. The combination of strong winds, heavy rainfall, and high seas resulted in severe damage to the island's coffee crop. As the hurricane passed through the western Atlantic, Bermuda recorded a period of tropical storm-force winds. The {[USS|Lee Fox}] encountered the storm on its voyage and was nearly capsized. As a post-tropical cyclone, the system produced winds near 70 mph (110 km/h) across Nova Scotia, cut electricity to Liverpool and Annapolis Valley (where the apple crop sustained $300,000 in losses), and disrupted telephone service in Halifax. Heavy surf washed out a 200 ft (60 m) section of railway in Shelburne while some railway lines in Lockeport suffered damage. A barge was severed from a large ship in Halifax and went aground on Georges Island.

=== Tropical Storm Ten ===
- Tropical storm (SSHWS)
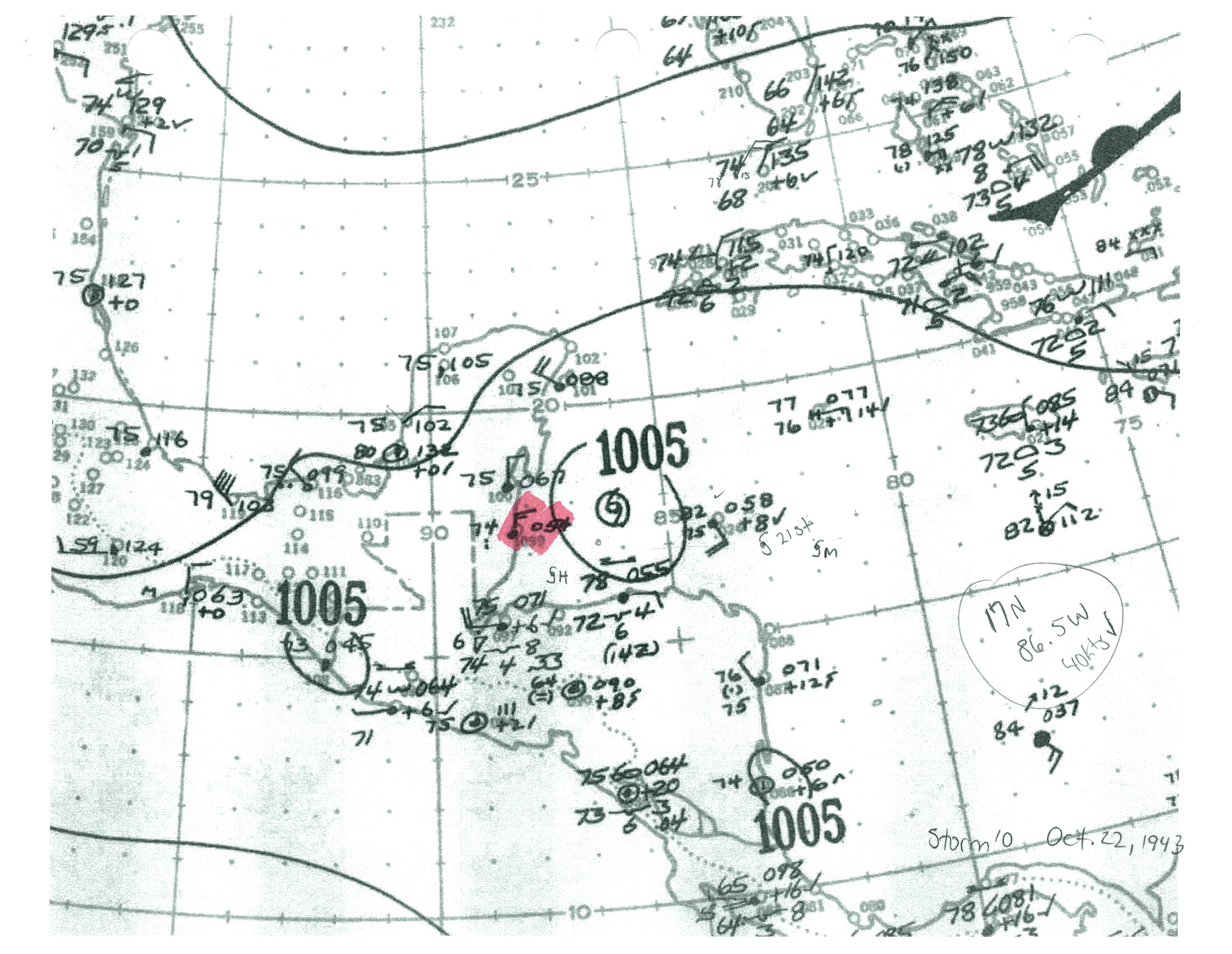
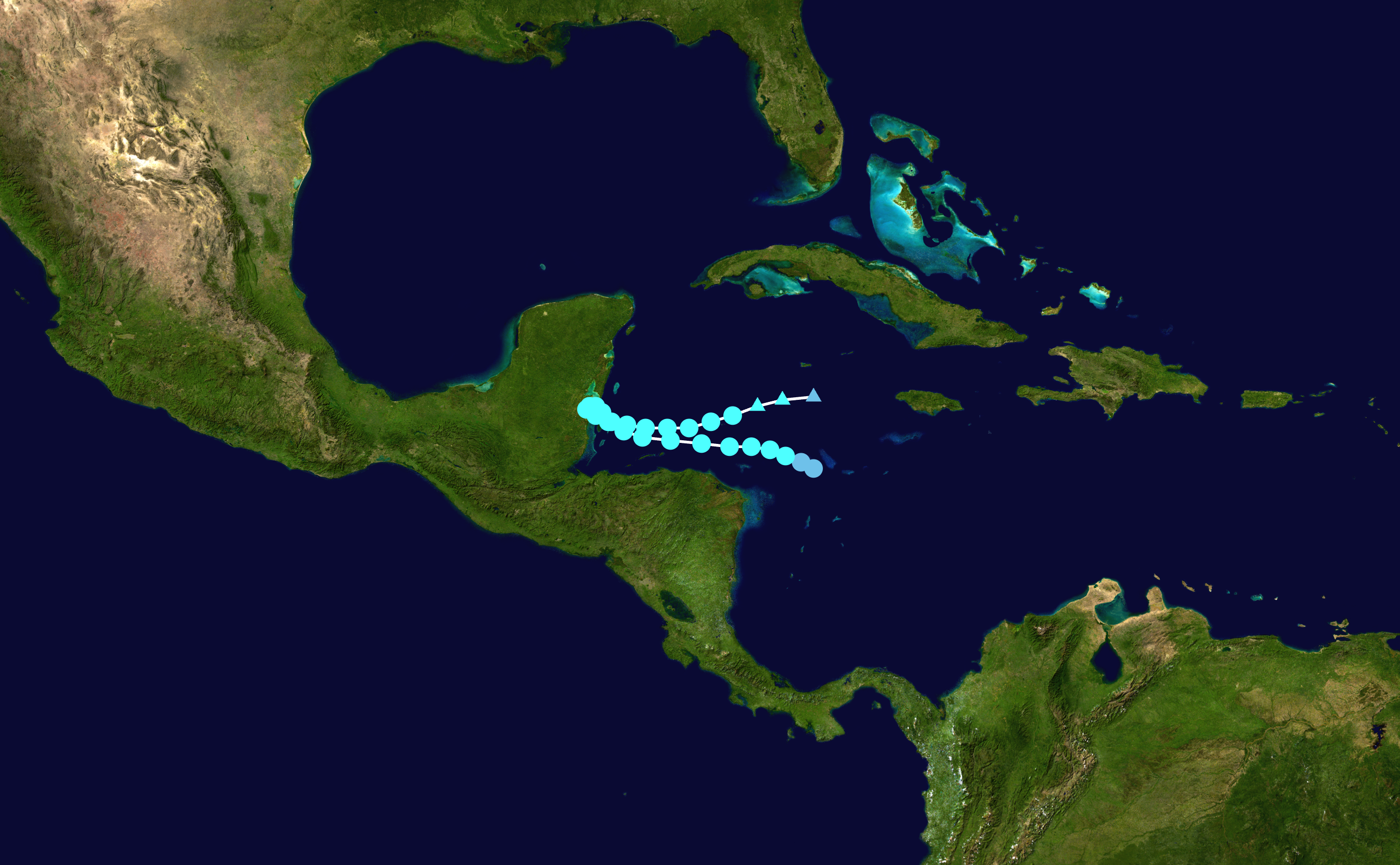
- Duration: October 20 – October 26
- Peak intensity: 45 mph (75 km/h) (1-min); 1004 mbar (hPa)

The final tropical cyclone of the season formed about 160 mi (260 km) northeast of the Honduras–Nicaragua border around 12:00 UTC on October 20. The fledgling cyclone intensified into a tropical storm twelve hours later and then attained winds of 45 mph (75 km/h) a while thereafter, marking its peak intensity. The system moved west for several days and passed through the Belize Barrier Reef before executing a sharp eastward turn early on October 24, causing only delayed shipping and aviation schedules, as well as peak winds of 35 mph (56 km/h) in the Swan Islands. From there, it maintained its status as a weak storm before transitioning into a post-tropical cyclone about 130 mi (215 km) southwest of the Cayman Islands by 06:00 UTC on October 26.

=== Other systems ===
On June 23, a 1,015 mb (hPa; 29.98 inHg) closed low—likely a tropical depression–was documented over the Little Bahama Banks. It drifted slowly northwest, moving ashore near the Florida–Georgia border by early on June 27. Gusty winds were recorded in Jacksonville and Savannah, but otherwise no impacts of note occurred.

== Season effects ==
This is a table of all the storms that have formed in the 1943 Atlantic hurricane season. It includes their duration, names, landfall(s), denoted in parentheses, damage, and death totals. Deaths in parentheses are additional and indirect (an example of an indirect death would be a traffic accident), but were still related to that storm. Damage and deaths include totals while the storm was extratropical, a wave, or a low, and all the damage figures are in 1943 US$.

Saffir–Simpson scale
TD	TS	C1	C2	C3	C4	C5

1943 North Atlantic tropical cyclones season statistics
Storm name	Dates active	Storm category at peak intensity	Max 1-min wind mph (km/h)	Min. press. (mbar)	Areas affected	Damage (US$)	Deaths	Ref(s).
Depression	June 23–27	Tropical depression	30 (45)	1011	Florida, Georgia	None	None	
One	July 25–30	Category 2 hurricane	105 (165)	967	Texas, Louisiana	$17 million	19	
Two	August 13–19	Tropical storm	60 (95)	1005	None	None	None	
Three	August 19–25	Category 4 hurricane	140 (220)	Unknown	Leeward Islands, Bermuda	None	None	
Four	September 1–9	Category 3 hurricane	120 (195)	Unknown	Bermuda	None	None	
Five	September 13–15	Tropical storm	50 (85)	1005	New England, Nova Scotia	Minimal	None	
Six	September 15–20	Category 2 hurricane	100 (160)	Unknown	Gulf Coast of the United States	$419,000	None	
Seven	September 28 – October 1	Tropical storm	65 (100)	997	Virginia, New Jersey	$20,000	1	
Eight	October 1–3	Tropical storm	70 (110)	999	Bermuda	None	None	
Nine	October 11–17	Category 2 hurricane	110 (175)	Unknown	Leeward Islands, Puerto Rico, Bermuda	$300,000	None	
Ten	October 20–26	Tropical storm	45 (75)	1004	Honduras	None	None	
Season aggregates
10 systems	July 25 – October 26		140 (220)	967		$17.739	20	

== See also ==
- 1943 Pacific hurricane season
- 1943 Pacific typhoon season
- 1900–1950 South-West Indian Ocean cyclone seasons
- 1940s Australian region cyclone seasons
- 1940s South Pacific cyclone seasons
