= 1943 Pacific typhoon season =

Seasonal boundaries
- First system formed: January 16, 1943
- Last system dissipated: December 22, 1943

Seasonal statistics
- Total storms: 34
- Total fatalities: Unknown
- Total damage: Unknown

Related articles
- 1943 Atlantic hurricane season; 1942–1948 Pacific hurricane seasons; 1940s North Indian Ocean cyclone seasons

The 1943 Pacific typhoon season has no official bounds; it ran year-round in 1943, but most tropical cyclones tend to form in the northwestern Pacific Ocean between June and December. These dates conventionally delimit the period of each year when most tropical cyclones form in the northwestern Pacific Ocean. The scope of this article is limited to the Pacific Ocean, north of the equator and west of the International Date Line. Storms that form east of the date line and north of the equator are called hurricanes; see 1943 Pacific hurricane season.

There were 34 tropical cyclones in the western Pacific in 1943.

== Systems ==
=== Typhoon One-W ===
- Category 1 typhoon (SSHWS)
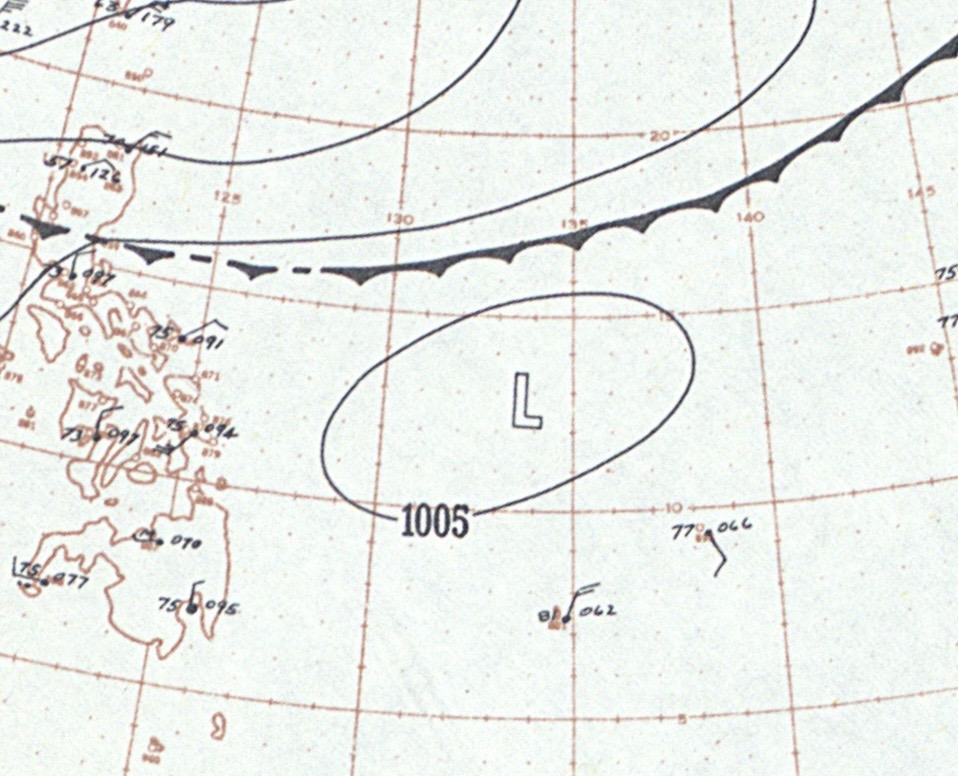
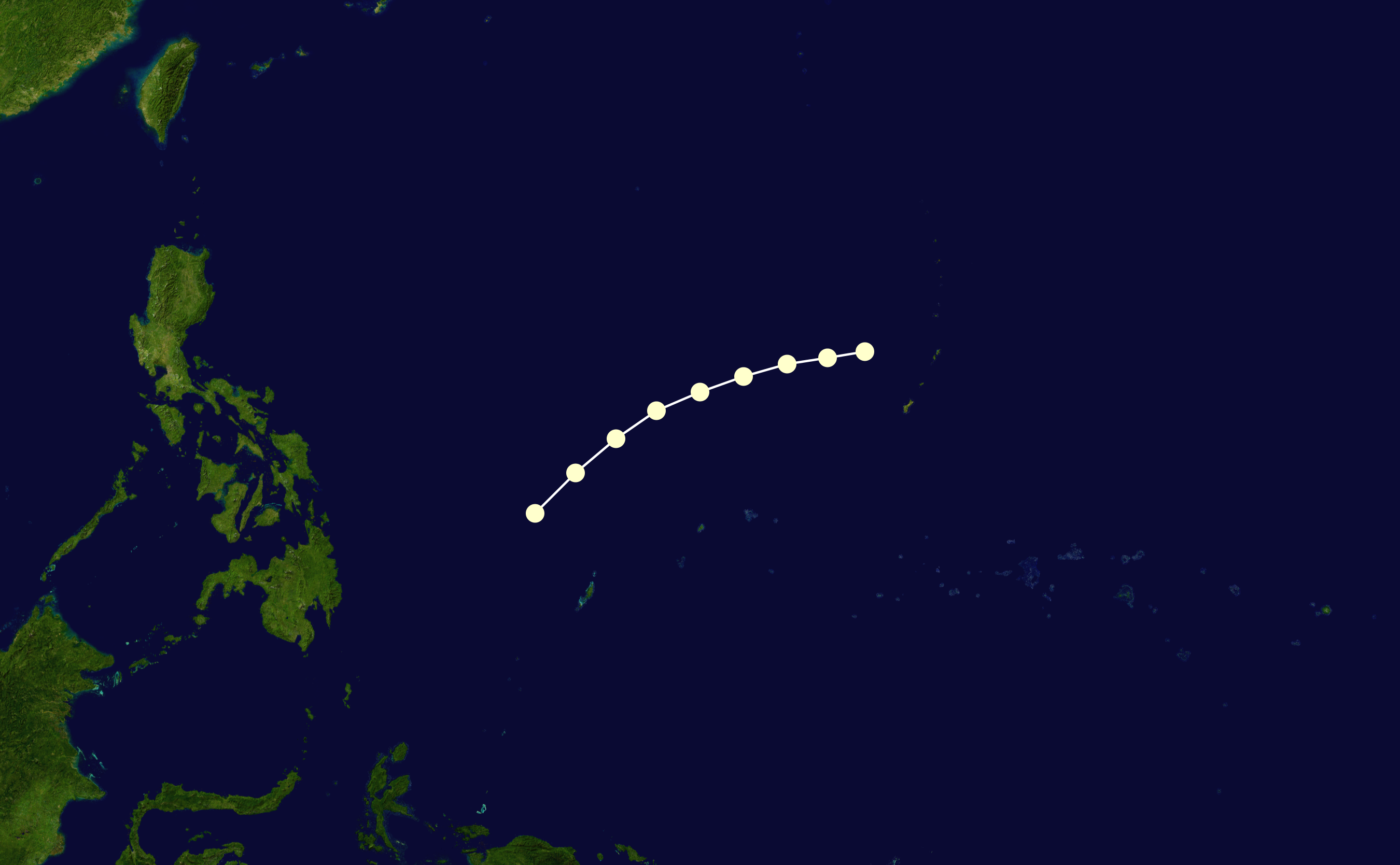
- Duration: January 16 – January 18
- Peak intensity: 120 km/h (75 mph) (1-min);

On January 16, the remnants of a weakening cold front to the east of the Philippines spawned an area of low pressure. The system became better organized as it moved to the northeast, however remained rather shallow. The low was absorbed by a cold front advancing from the north early on January 18, just to the north-northwest of Guam. Based on data from Chin's Atlas the system achieved typhoon strength between the 16 and the 18 of January, however historical weather maps indicated the system never strengthened to a tropical storm.

=== Tropical Storm Two-W ===
- Tropical storm (SSHWS)
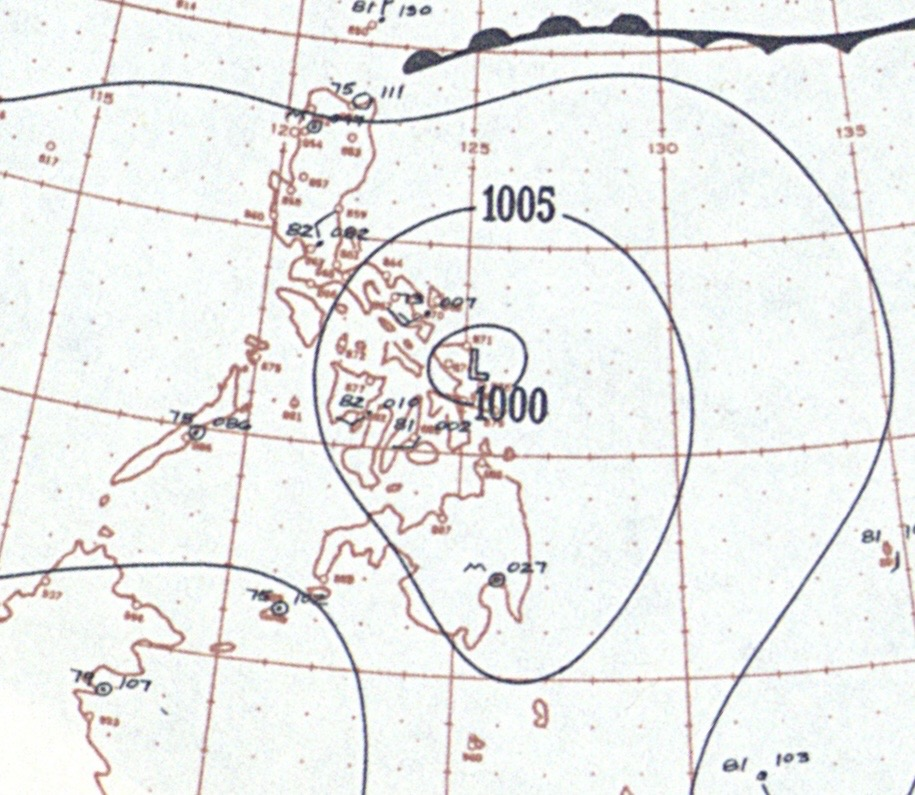
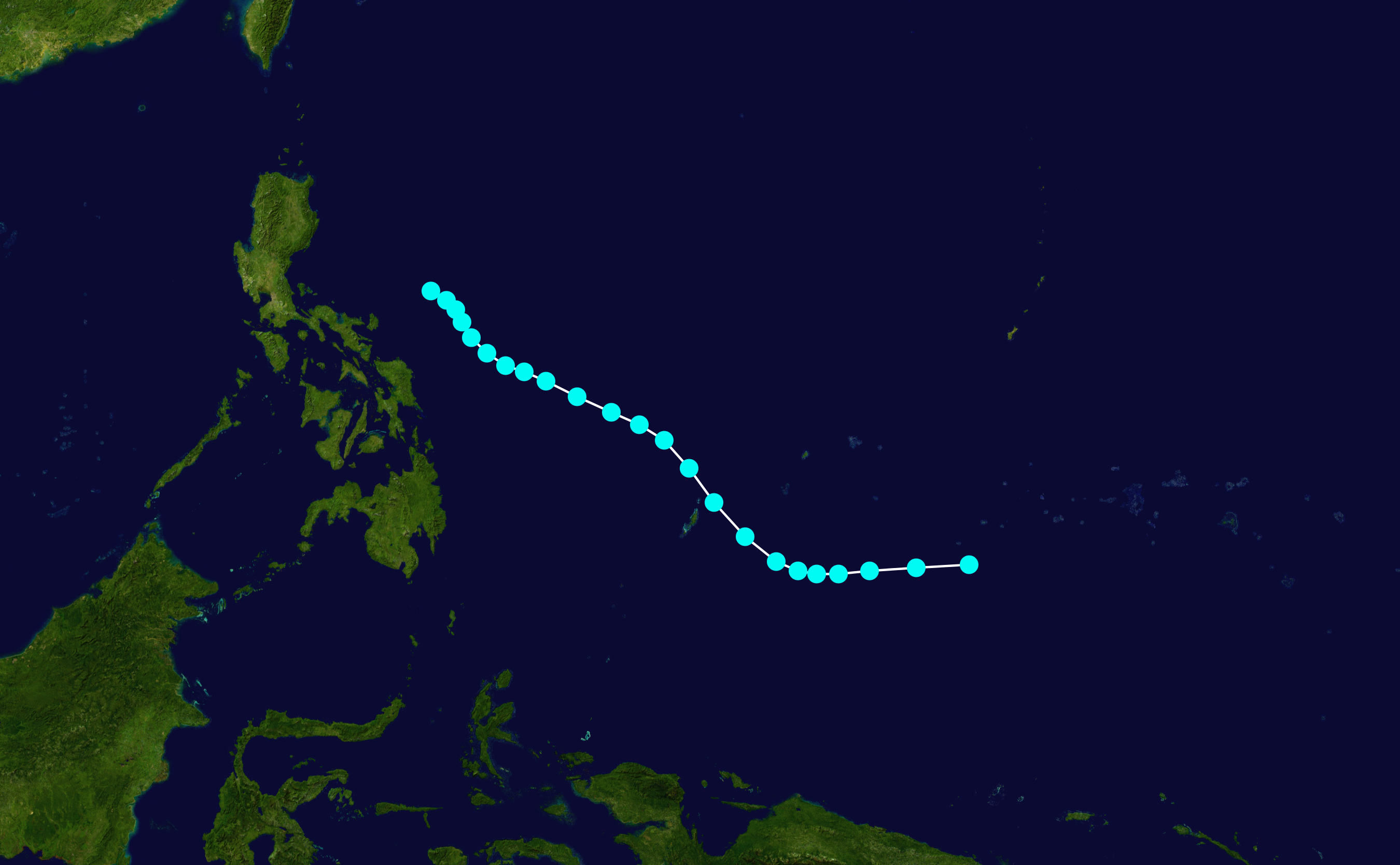
- Duration: April 9 – April 18
- Peak intensity: 100 km/h (65 mph) (1-min);

A tropical low formed to the southwest of Guam and west of Palau on April 8. It moved westward over the next few days and continued to gradually deepen. Discrepancy in the location and strength of the system between Chin's Atlas and weather maps makes it difficult to pinpoint where the system went to after this point. The Chin's Atlas data set has the system moving to the north of Palau and eventually dissipating to the northeast of Catanduanes as a tropical storm on April 16. Historic weather maps has the low moving straight west towards Mindanao, and curving sharply to the north on the 13. Afterwards the low strengthens to a tropical storm while paralleling the coast to the east during April 14. On April 15 the storm made landfall in Eastern Samar with a pressure below 1000 millibars. Afterwards the storm weakened and moved north in response to a nearby front and stalled to the east of Luzon. An area of low pressure soon evolved to the north near Taiwan, on April 18, and moved the stalled depression to the north east. Later the system became absorbed with a cold front.

=== Tropical Storm Three-W ===
- Tropical storm (SSHWS)
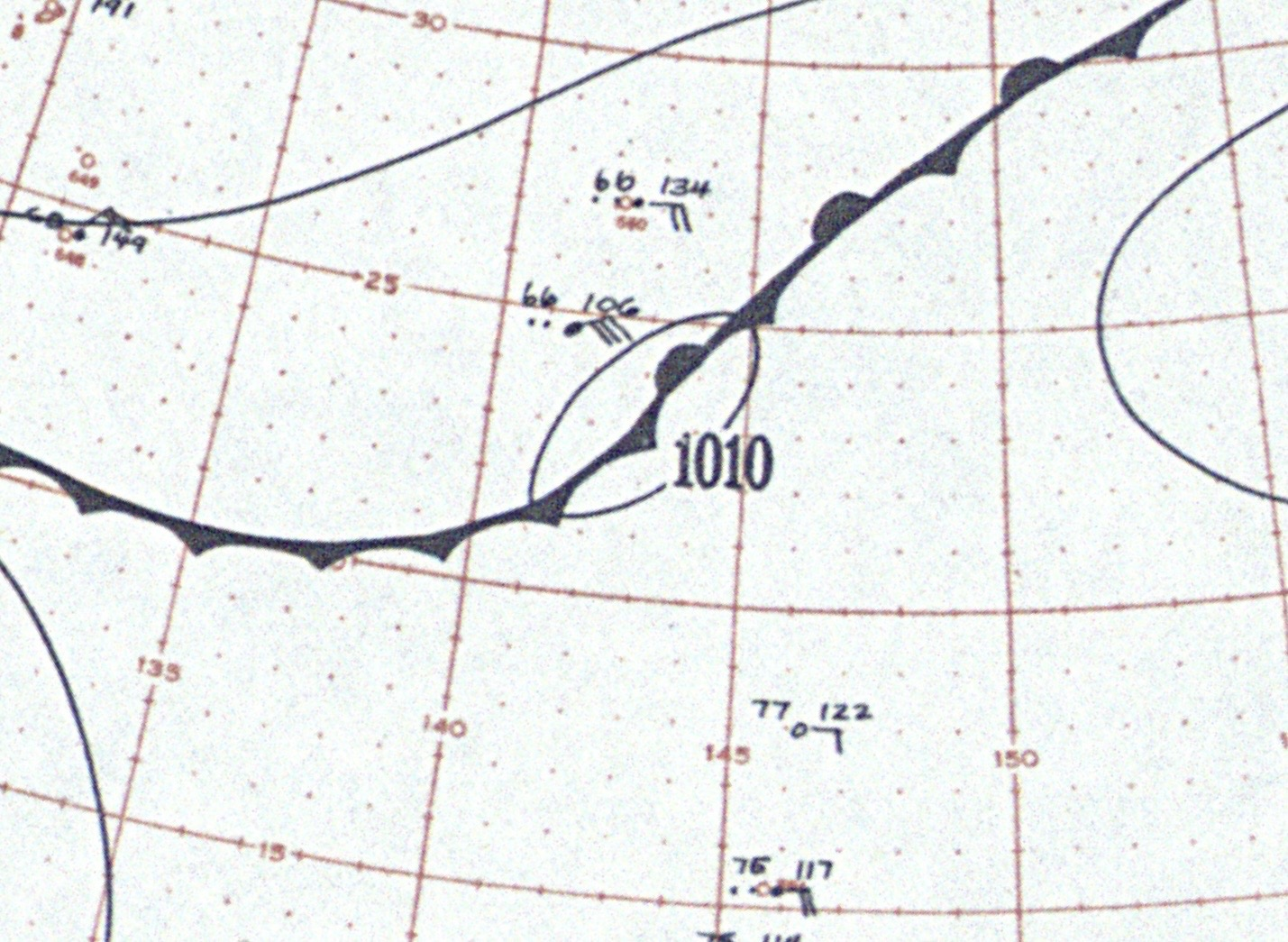
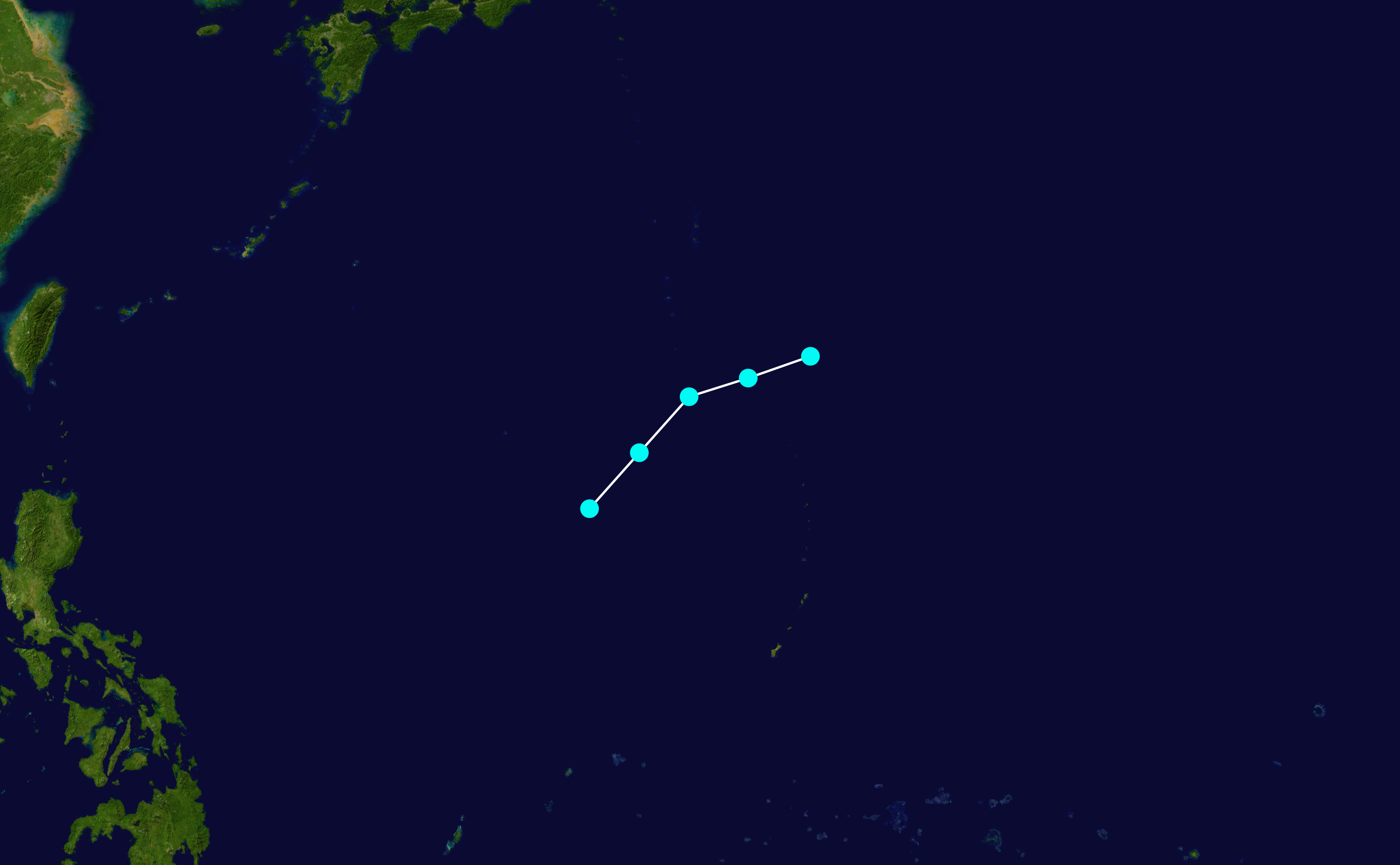
- Duration: April 15 – April 16
- Peak intensity: 95 km/h (60 mph) (1-min);

Chin's Atlas has a tropical storm moving to the northwest of the Mariana Islands between the 15 and 16 of April. Weather maps indicate a weak low pressure area attached to a cold front, likely indicating the storm was extra-tropical in nature. The remnants of the storm was located several miles south of Japan.

=== Typhoon Four-W ===
- Category 1 typhoon (SSHWS)
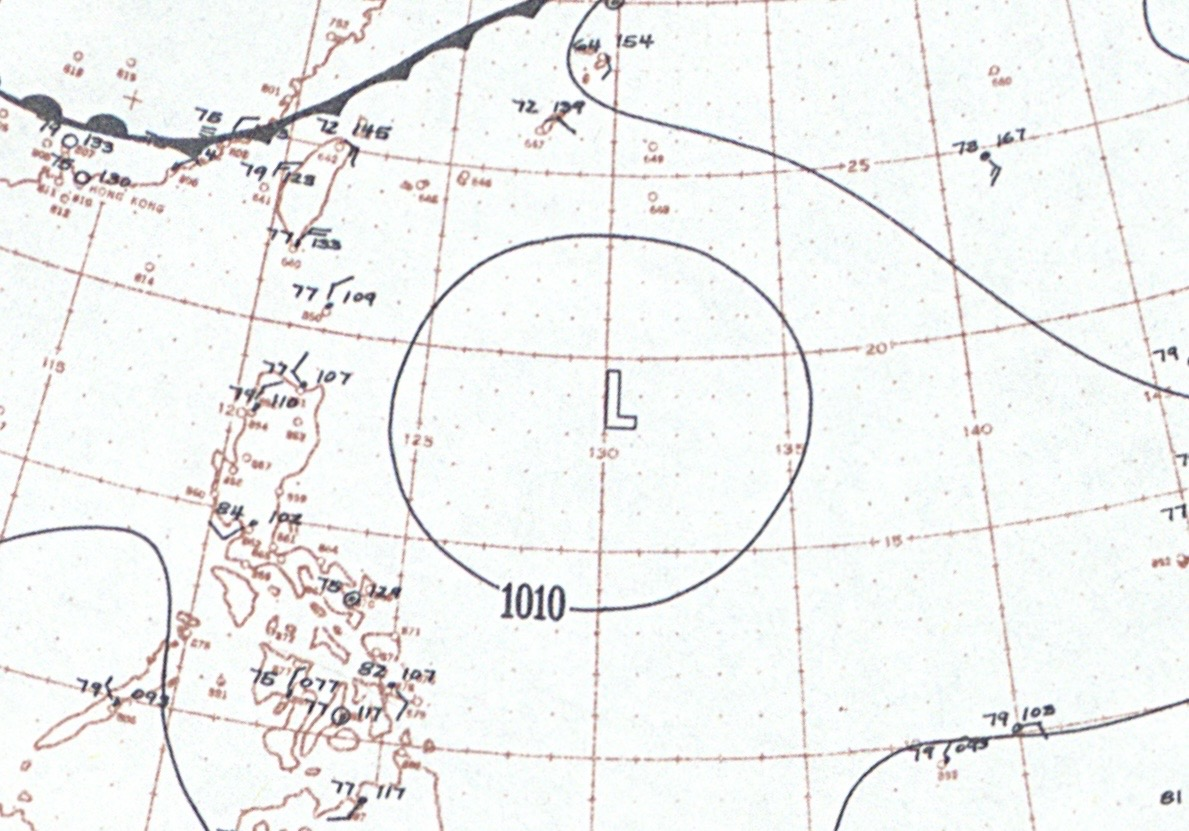
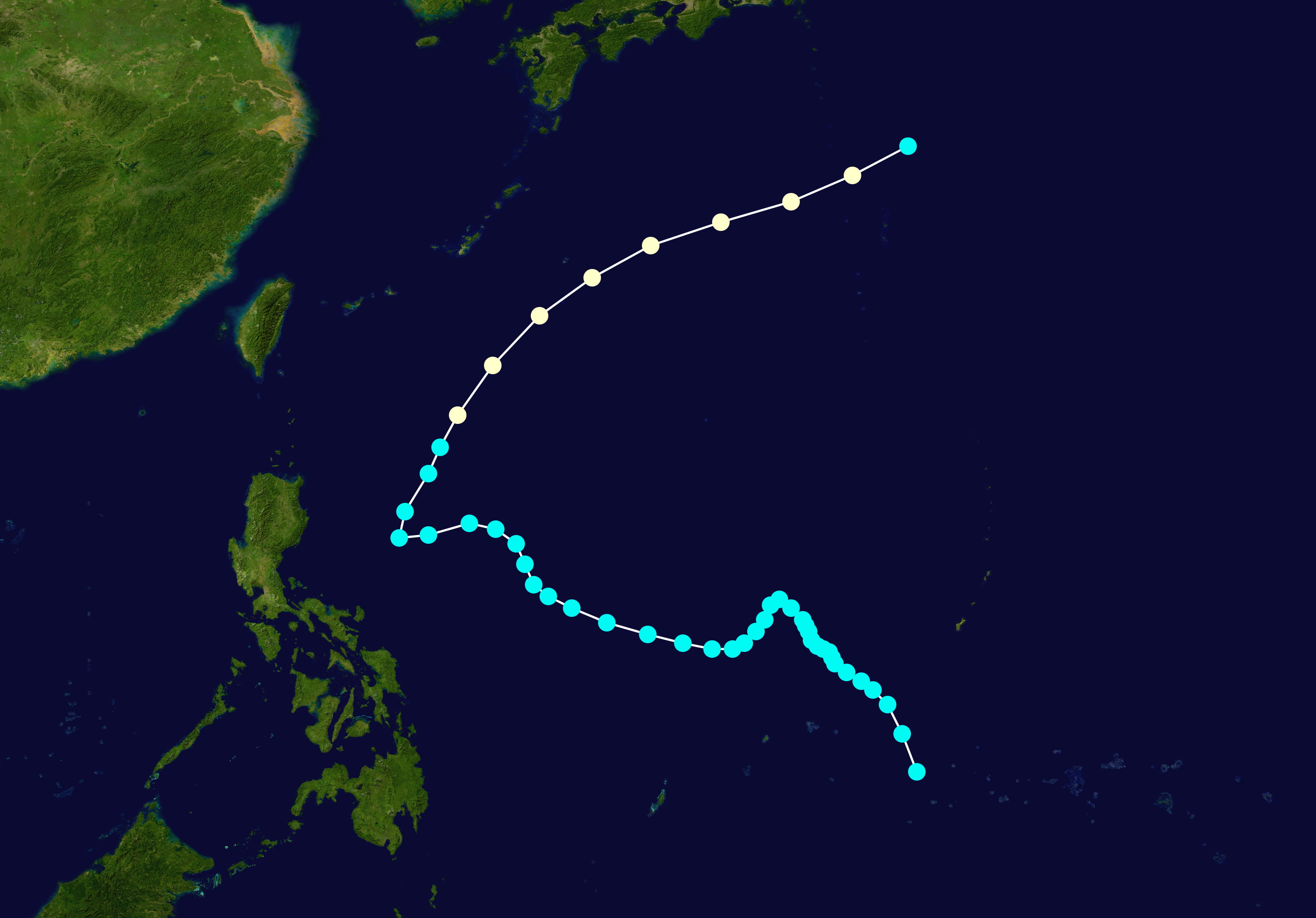
- Duration: April 28 – May 10
- Peak intensity: 130 km/h (80 mph) (1-min);

A disturbance formed south southwest of the Mariana Islands on April 27. It gradually intensified into a tropical depression on the 28th. The storm dissipated on May 10.

=== Typhoon Five-W ===
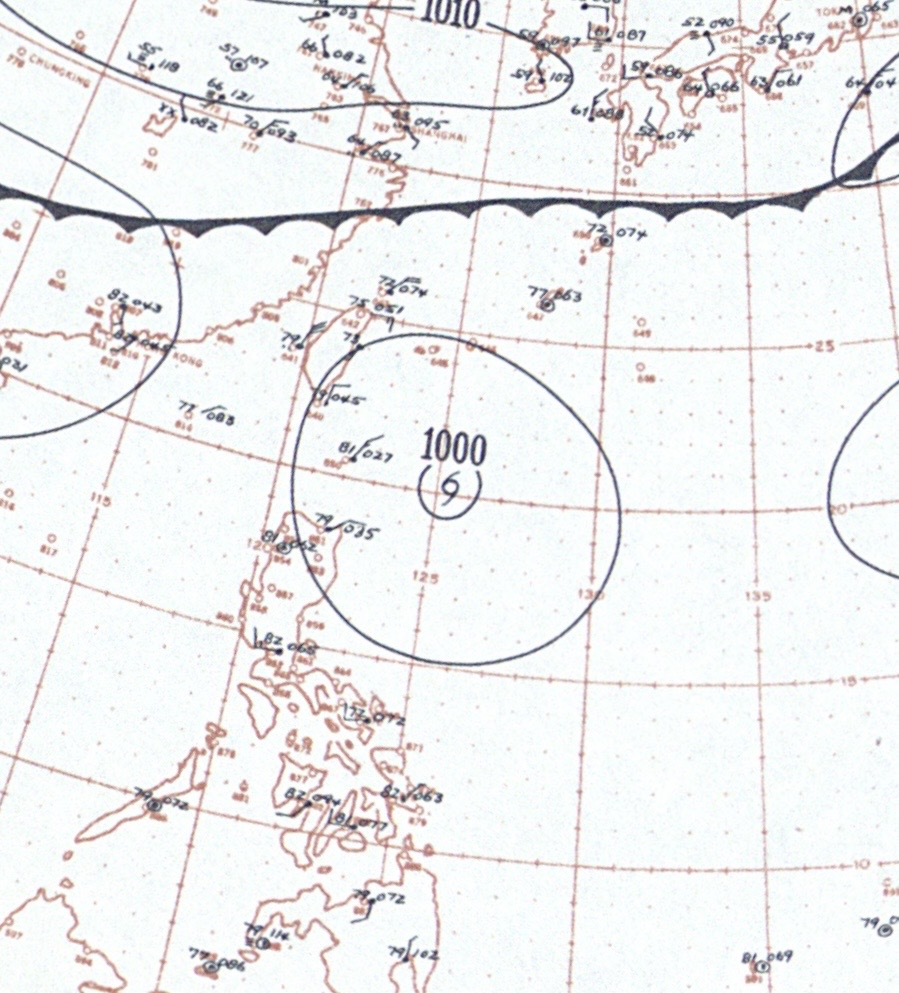
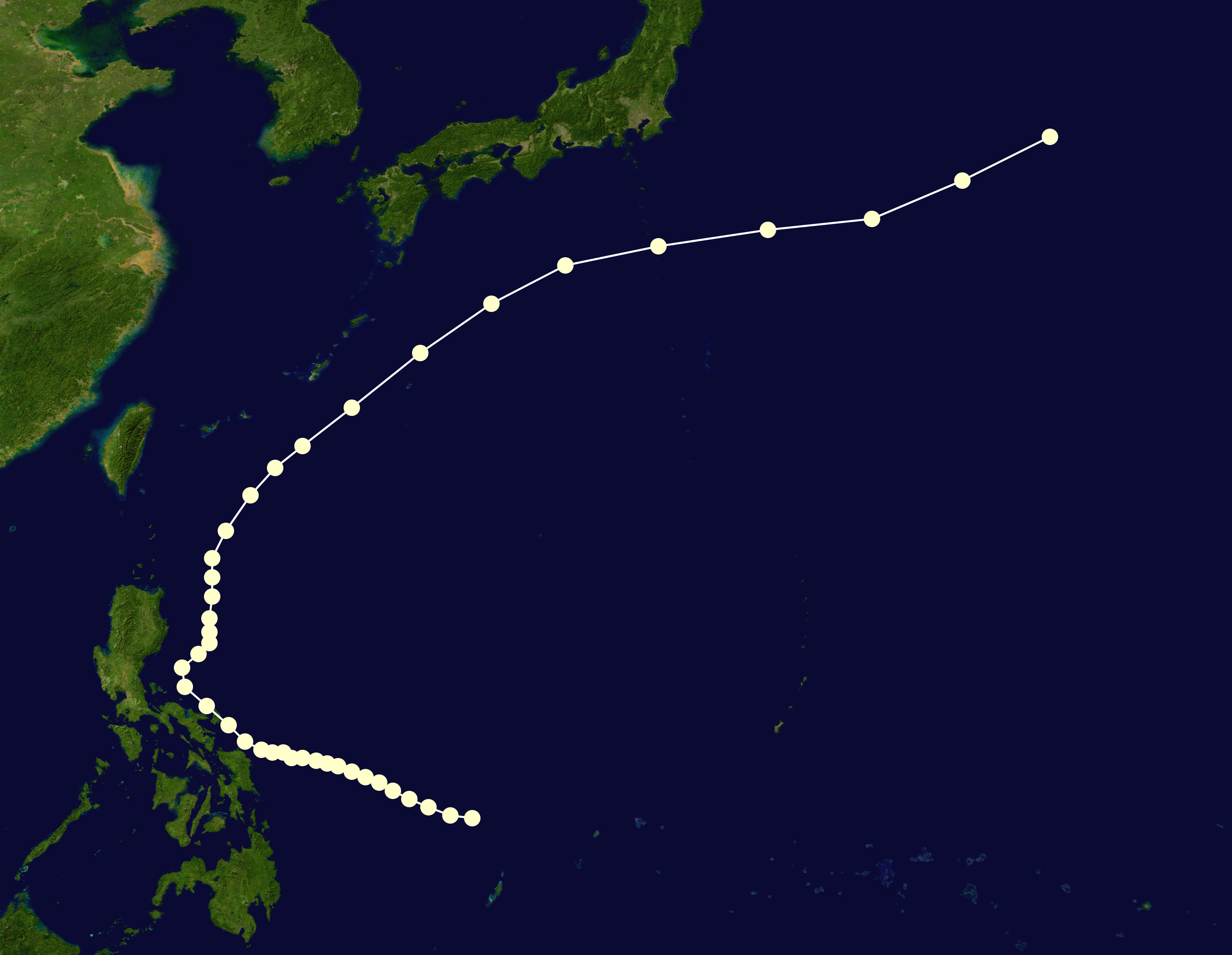
- Duration: May 10 – May 20

A storm developed in the Philippine Sea and east of Visayas, Philippines on May 10. It strengthened into a typhoon during its lifecycle but it is unknown of where it reached its intensity. The storm finally dissipated on May 20.

== See also ==
- Pacific typhoon season
- 1900–1950 South-West Indian Ocean cyclone seasons
- 1940s Australian region cyclone seasons
- 1940s South Pacific cyclone seasons
