= 1900s Australian region cyclone seasons =

Seasonal boundaries
- First system formed: 1900
- Last system dissipated: 1910

Seasonal statistics
- Total fatalities: Unknown
- Total damage: Unknown

The following is a list of Australian region tropical cyclones from 1900 to 1910.

== Storms ==
=== Cyclone Leonta (March 1903) ===
Cyclone Leonta was a tropical cyclone that caused severe damage in North Queensland on 9 March 1903, with approximately 14 lives lost (12 in Townsville and 2 in Charters Towers).

=== Unnamed tropical cyclone (January 1906) ===
On 27 January 1906, a tropical cyclone crossed the coast, near Cairns. The houses were destroyed, trees were uprooted and spread across the towns, and the Rhodes Hotel and the Crown Hotel sustained damages. Some commercial buildings and a church are also damaged. In Innisfail, some structures were shattered, and some banana plantations and canefields were washed out. The cyclone was last noted, the next day.

=== Unnamed tropical cyclone (March 1906) ===
On 4 March 1906, another cyclone crossed the coast, near Cairns. The town of Croydon were completely destroyed due to the storm. Two churches were wrecked and the post office sustained roof damages. The Court House were shattered and severe damages across the town were seen after the cyclone passed. The Normanton and Mackay also experienced gale-force winds. A river overflowed, and a bridge were washed out in Cattle Creek.

=== Unnamed tropical cyclone (January 1907) ===
A developing tropical cyclone was detected in the Coral Sea on 17 January 1907. The system made landfall to the north of Hope Vale on the next day as it accelerated to the southwest. It then turned to the north-northwest, then to the south, before emerging in the Gulf of Carpentaria on 22 January, near Kowanyama. Tracking again to the southwest, the cyclone made landfall to the north of Burketown on the next day, before dissipating on 26 January.

Many buildings were destroyed and/or sustained damages. Crops were also washed out and there were 9 fatalities reported.

=== Unnamed tropical cyclone (January 1908) ===
On 6 January 1908, a tropical cyclone formed in the Gulf of Carpentaria, east of Nhulunbuy. Moving to the west-southwest, the system made landfall near Aurukun on the same day. It soon moved offshore in the Coral Sea on the next day, before it was last noted on 10 January.

=== Unnamed tropical cyclone (March 1908) ===
On 11 March 1908, a tropical cyclone was detected in the Coral Sea. Moving to the south-southeast, the cyclone hit the coast, near the Dawson Beach on the same day. It was last noted on 13 March as it dissipated inland, to the west of Sunshine Beach.

Widespread damaged are reported at St. Lawrence and Nebo. The fatalities from the cyclone were unknown.

=== Unnamed tropical cyclone near Ninety Mile Beach (April 1908) ===
On 27 April 1908, the pearling fleet (again) at Ninety Mile Beach experienced the full force of a storm. The loss of life exceeded 50 persons.

=== Possible tropical cyclone in Western Australia (January 1909) ===
A possible tropical cyclone affected Exmouth on 20 January 1909. A schooner and two more luggers were destroyed and a river overflowed. The total damages and deaths were unknown.

=== Unnamed tropical cyclone (January 1909) ===
On 29 January 1909, a developing tropical cyclone was detected near Alotau. Slowly moving to the southeast, the cyclone reached its peak intensity of 990 hPa on February 2 before weakening. It was last noted, near the eastern boundary of the basin on the next day. No landmasses were affected.

=== Unnamed tropical cyclone (1909 Normanton cyclone) ===
A cyclone developed in the Gulf of Carpentaria on an unknown date. On 4 March 1909, the cyclone crossed, just 4 km, near Normanton. Gale-force winds were experienced and there were trees uprooted. Many houses across the town were either sustained damages and/or damaged. A tornado may have been spawned by the cyclone. No fatalities were reported.

=== Unnamed tropical cyclone (March 1909) ===
A cyclone may passed over and/or near Borroloola on 12 March, which was last noted on the next day. The fatalities and damages were unknown. However, this is not included in the records of Bureau of Meteorology.

=== Unnamed tropical cyclone (April 1909) ===
Following a cyclone at Onslow, Western Australia in January 1909, a second storm hit the town on 5 to 6 April 1909, causing damage to most boats and some buildings. Four luggers with all 24 of their crew were lost.

=== Unnamed tropical cyclone (January 1910) ===
On 24 January, a tropical cyclone with a minimum barometric pressure of 988 hPa was detected to the south-southeast of Port Moresby. At that time, the cyclone was weakening and on 27 January, it made landfall near Cape Tribulation with below gale-force winds. It moved offshore on that day, before dissipating on 30 January, just near the eastern boundary of the basin.

Rough seas and gale-force winds were experienced at Cairns. Two boats we're driven ashore and heavy rains overflowed rivers in Townsville. In Rockhampton, there were railway damages and some houses destroyed. In Mackay, the bridges were washed out and there were stock losses.

== See also ==
- 1900–1940 South Pacific cyclone seasons
- 1900–1950 South-West Indian Ocean cyclone seasons
- Atlantic hurricane seasons: 1900, 1901, 1902, 1903, 1904, 1905, 1906, 1907, 1908, 1909
- Eastern Pacific hurricane seasons: 1900, 1901, 1902, 1903, 1904, 1905, 1906, 1907, 1908, 1909
- Western Pacific typhoon seasons: 1900, 1901, 1902, 1903, 1904, 1905, 1906, 1907, 1908, 1909
- North Indian Ocean cyclone seasons: 1900, 1901, 1902, 1903, 1904, 1905, 1906, 1907, 1908, 1909
