= 1905 Atlantic hurricane season =

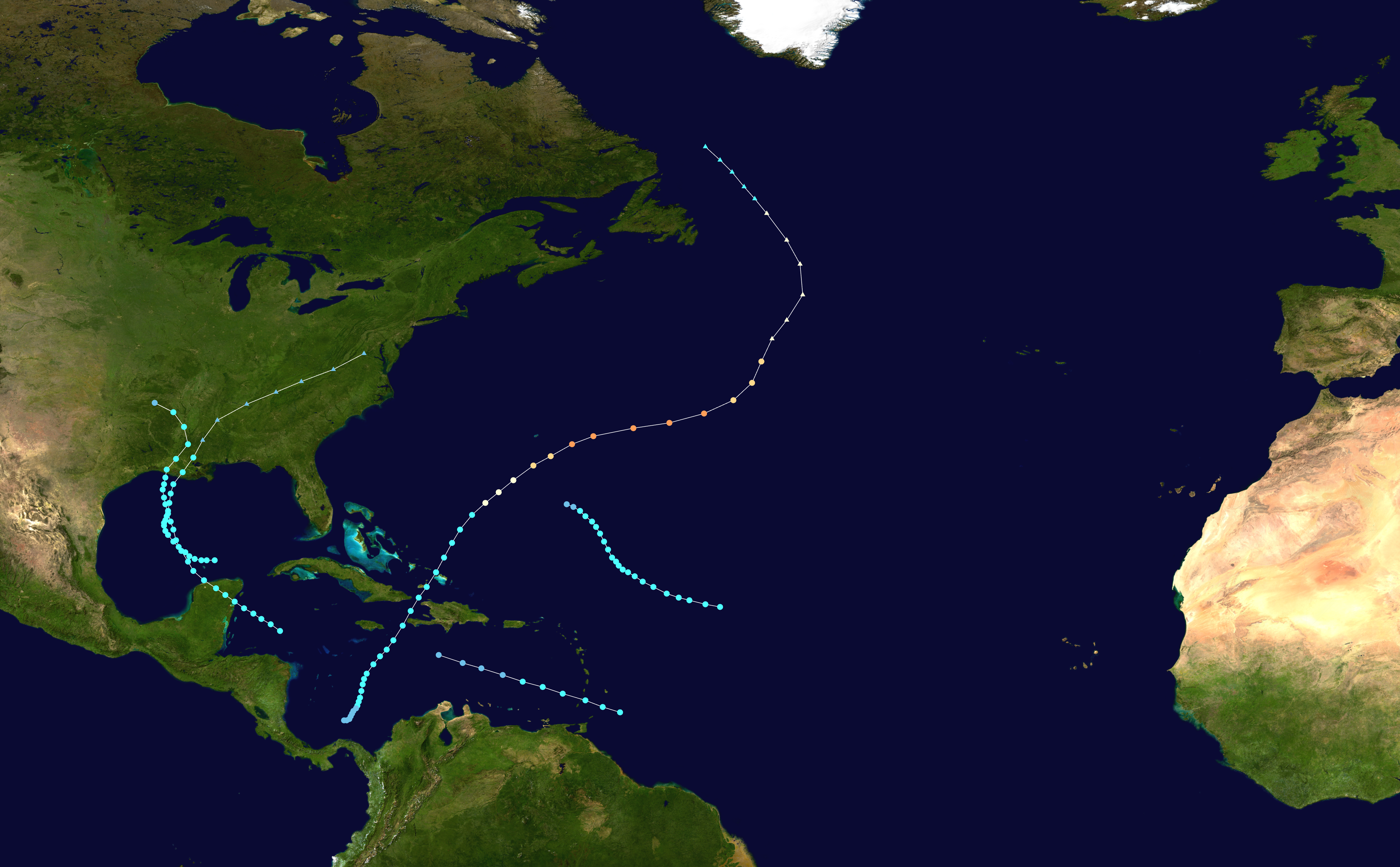
- Season summary map

Seasonal boundaries
- First system formed: September 6, 1905
- Last system dissipated: October 10, 1905

Strongest storm
- Name: Four
  - Maximum winds: 120 mph (195 km/h) (1-minute sustained)

Seasonal statistics
- Total storms: 5
- Hurricanes: 1
- Major hurricanes (Cat. 3+): 1
- Total fatalities: 8
- Total damage: Unknown

Related articles
- 1900–09 Pacific hurricane seasons; 1902-19 Pacific typhoon seasons; 1900s North Indian Ocean cyclone seasons

The 1905 Atlantic hurricane season featured five known tropical cyclones, two of which made landfall in the United States. The first system was initially observed near the Windward Islands on September 6. The last system to dissipate, the fourth storm, transitioned into an extratropical cyclone on October 11, while located well southeast of Newfoundland. These dates fall within the period with the most tropical cyclone activity in the Atlantic.

Of the season's five tropical cyclones, only one reached hurricane status. It attained hurricane strength on October 8, the latest first hurricane on record in an Atlantic season, a mark later tied in 2026. Two later seasons—1907 and 1914—had no recorded hurricanes. Furthermore, that storm strengthened into a Category 3 major hurricane on the modern-day Saffir–Simpson scale. At least six fatalities were attributed to the system, which sent a rogue wave across the steerage of the Cunard steamer RMS Campania. The first storm also resulted in two deaths after a schooner wrecked in Barbados.

The season's activity was reflected with an accumulated cyclone energy (ACE) rating of 28, the lowest value since 1864. ACE is a metric used to express the energy used by a tropical cyclone during its lifetime. Therefore, a storm with a longer duration will have high values of ACE. It is only calculated at six-hour increments in which specific tropical and subtropical systems are either at or above sustained wind speeds of 39 mph (63 km/h), which is the threshold for tropical storm intensity. Thus, tropical depressions are not included here.

== Systems ==
=== Tropical Storm One ===
- Tropical storm (SSHWS)
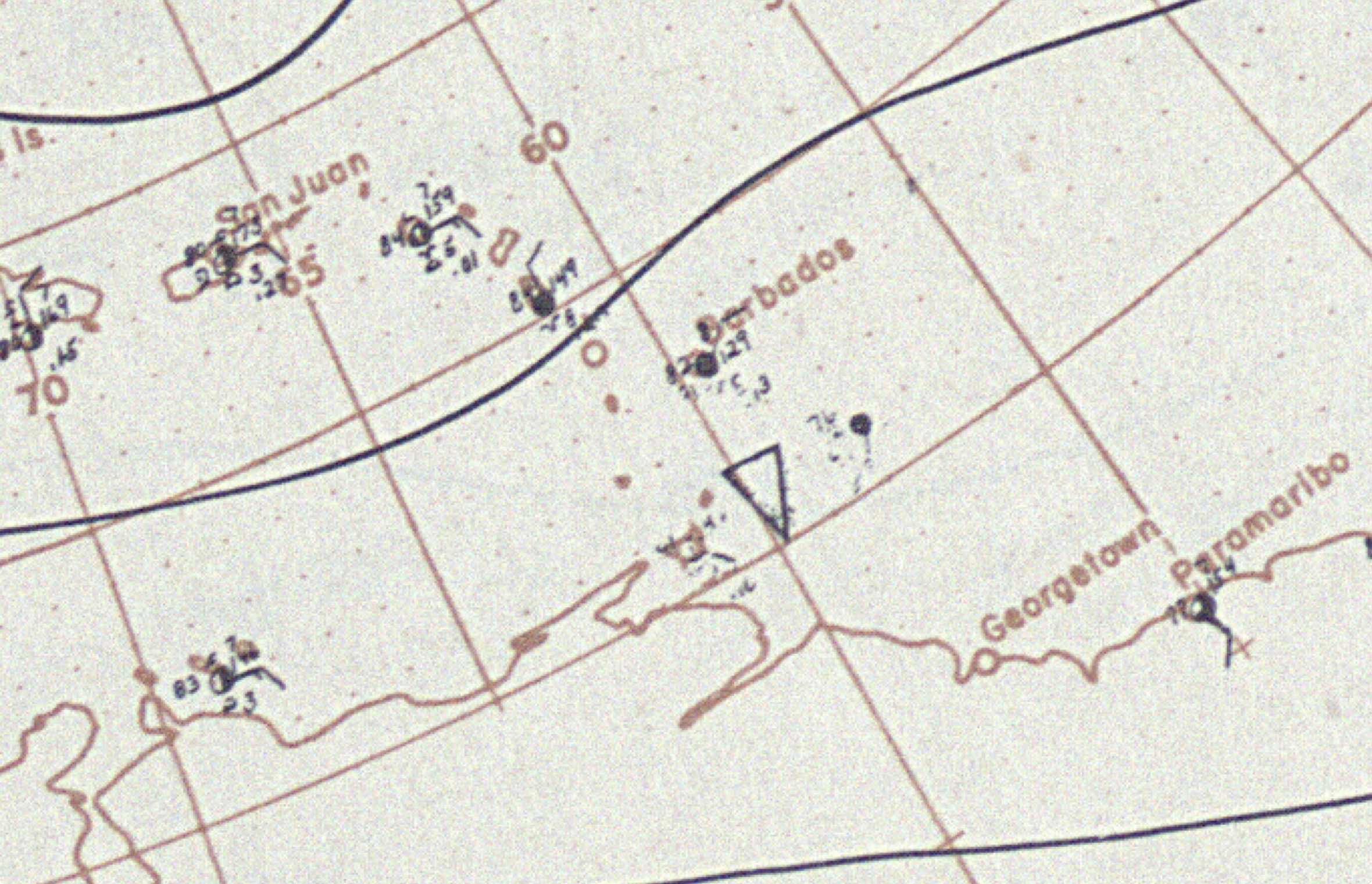
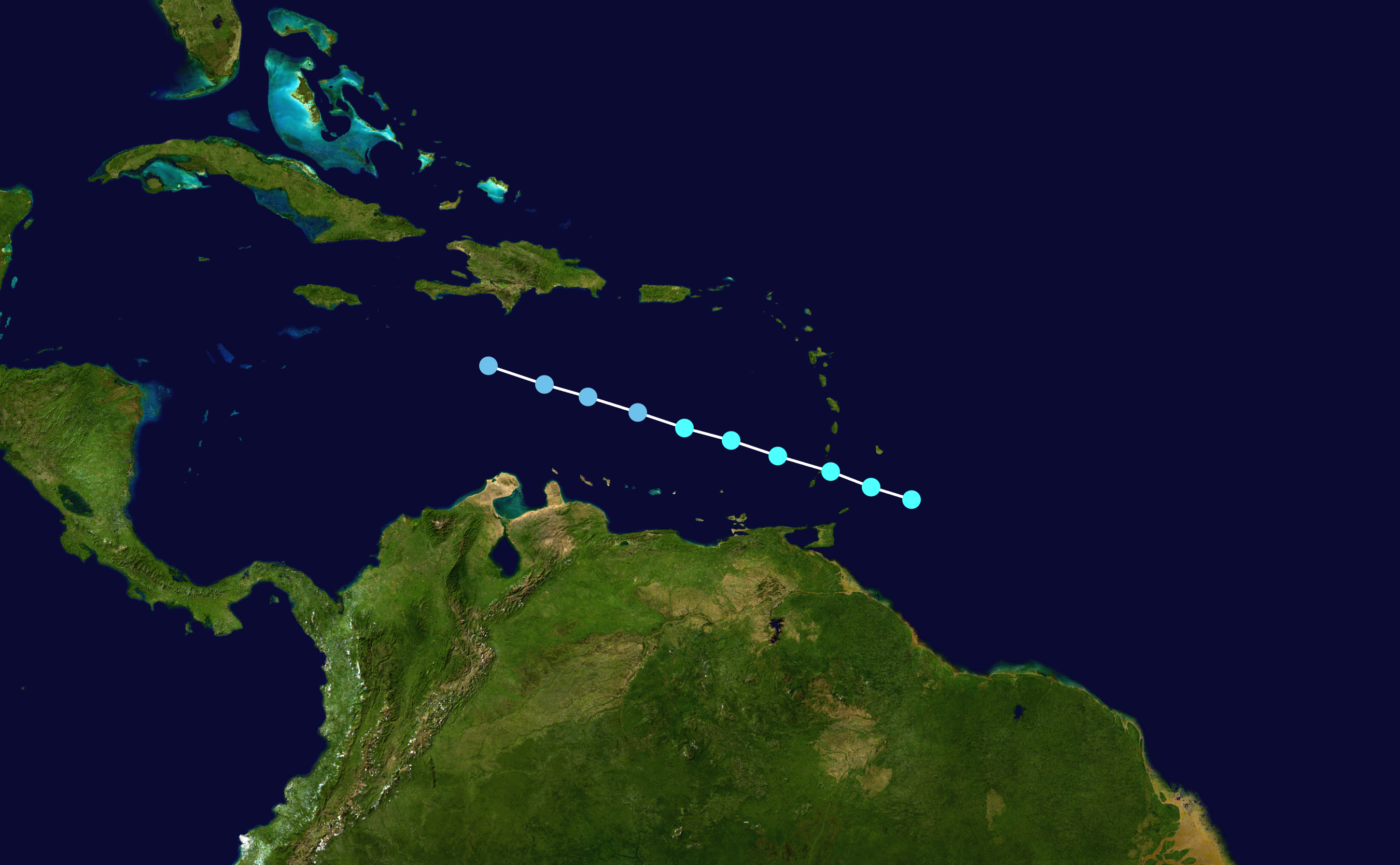
- Duration: September 6 – September 8
- Peak intensity: 60 mph (95 km/h) (1-min);

The first storm of the season, already at tropical storm intensity, was identified on September 6 to the east of Grenada. A small storm, it quickly passed through the southern Lesser Antilles early on September 7. The next day, the storm weakened to a tropical depression before dissipating as a shallow but large system. A schooner sailing from Bridgetown to Suriname encountered heavy seas just a day out of port and turned back. It was thrown onto the pierhead and wrecked. The captain and a crewman were swept overboard and drowned.

=== Tropical Storm Two ===
- Tropical storm (SSHWS)
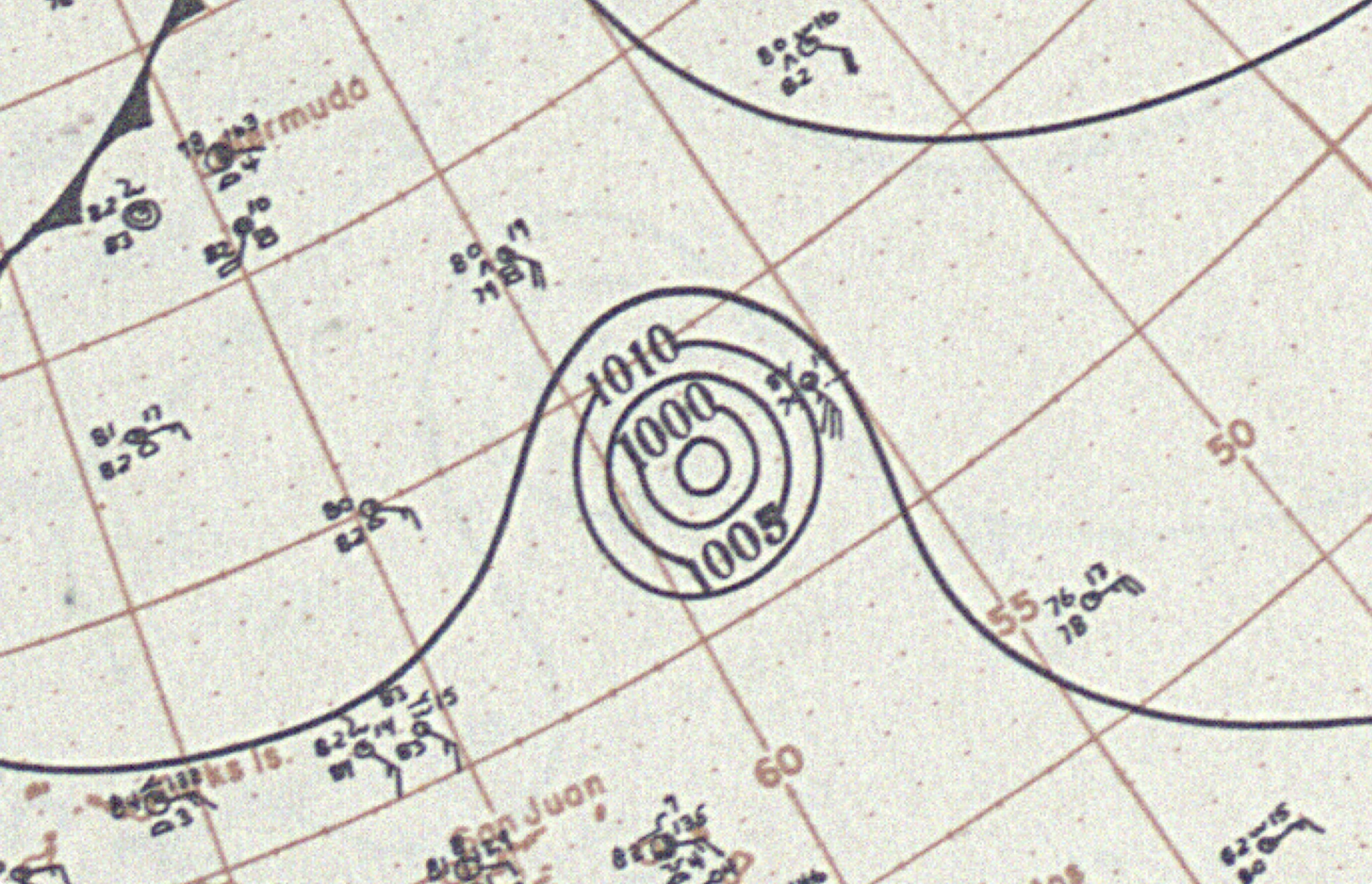
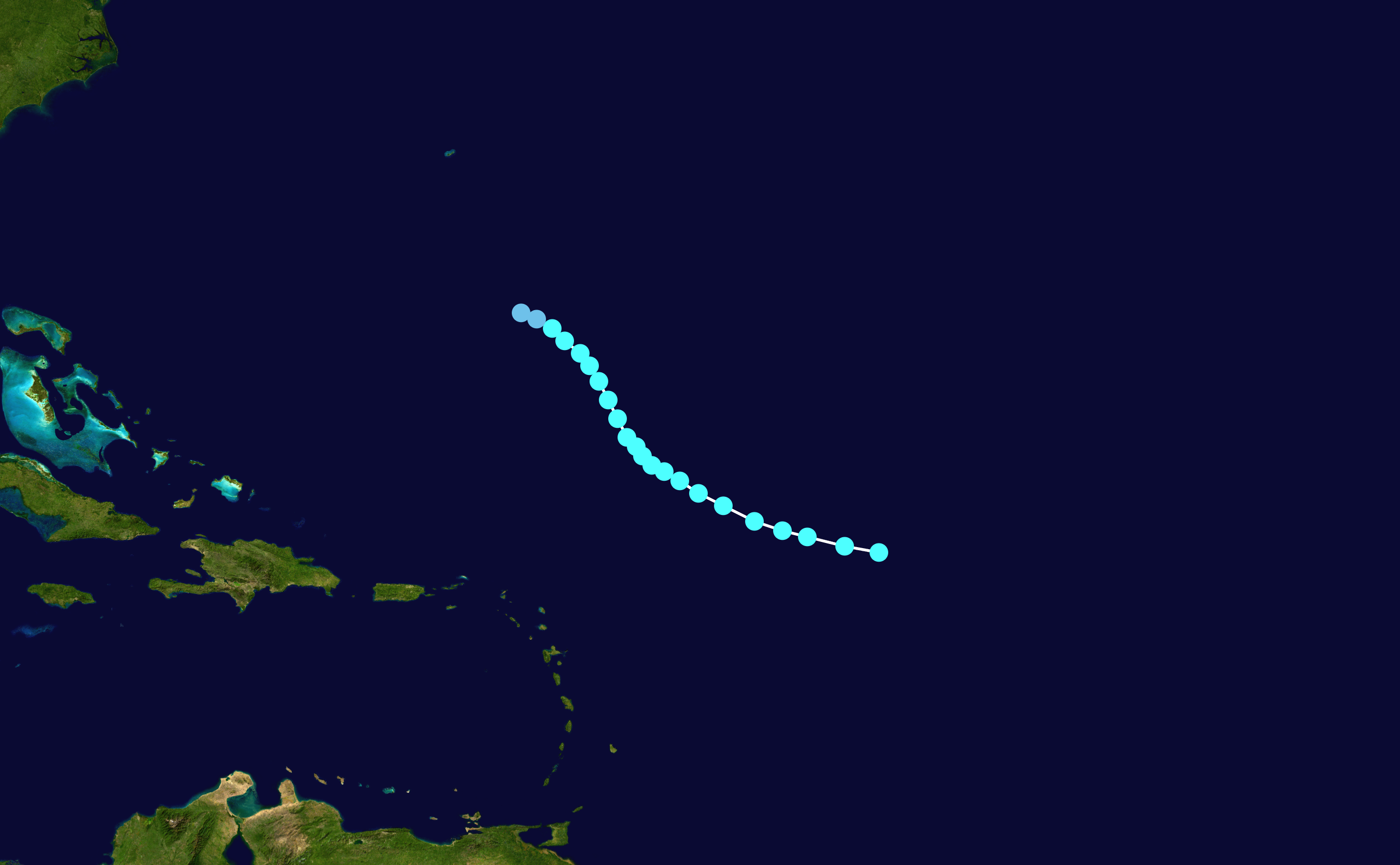
- Duration: September 11 – September 16
- Peak intensity: 60 mph (95 km/h) (1-min); <1004 mbar (hPa)

HURDAT indicates that a tropical storm originated to the northeast of the Windward Islands on September 11. Steadily tracking towards the west-northwest, the storm gradually intensified, reaching its peak intensity with winds estimated at 60 mph (95 km/h) on September 13. After turning northwestward, the system slowed and began to weaken. By September 16, the storm weakened to a tropical depression and dissipated shortly thereafter.

=== Tropical Storm Three ===
- Tropical storm (SSHWS)
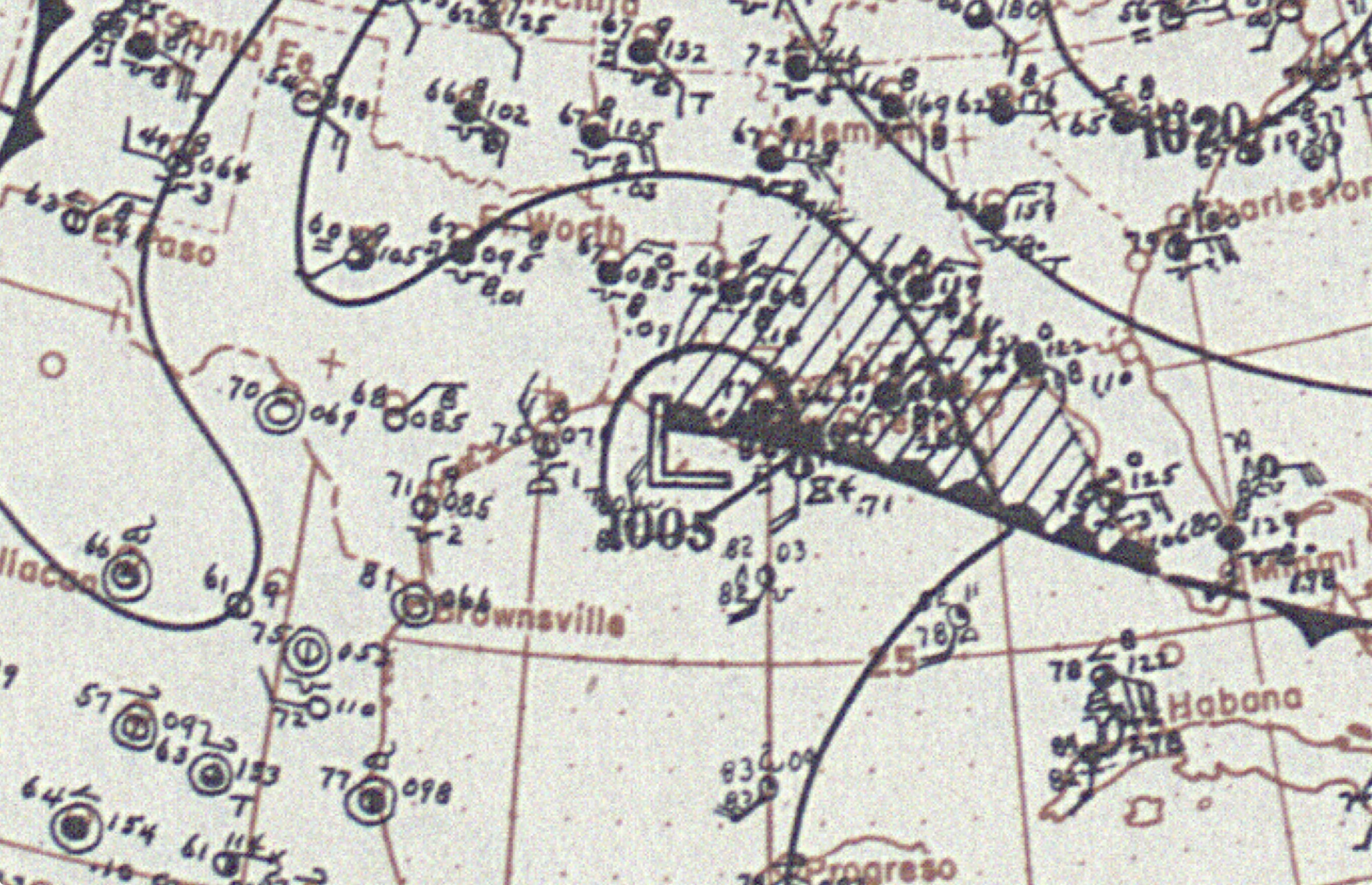
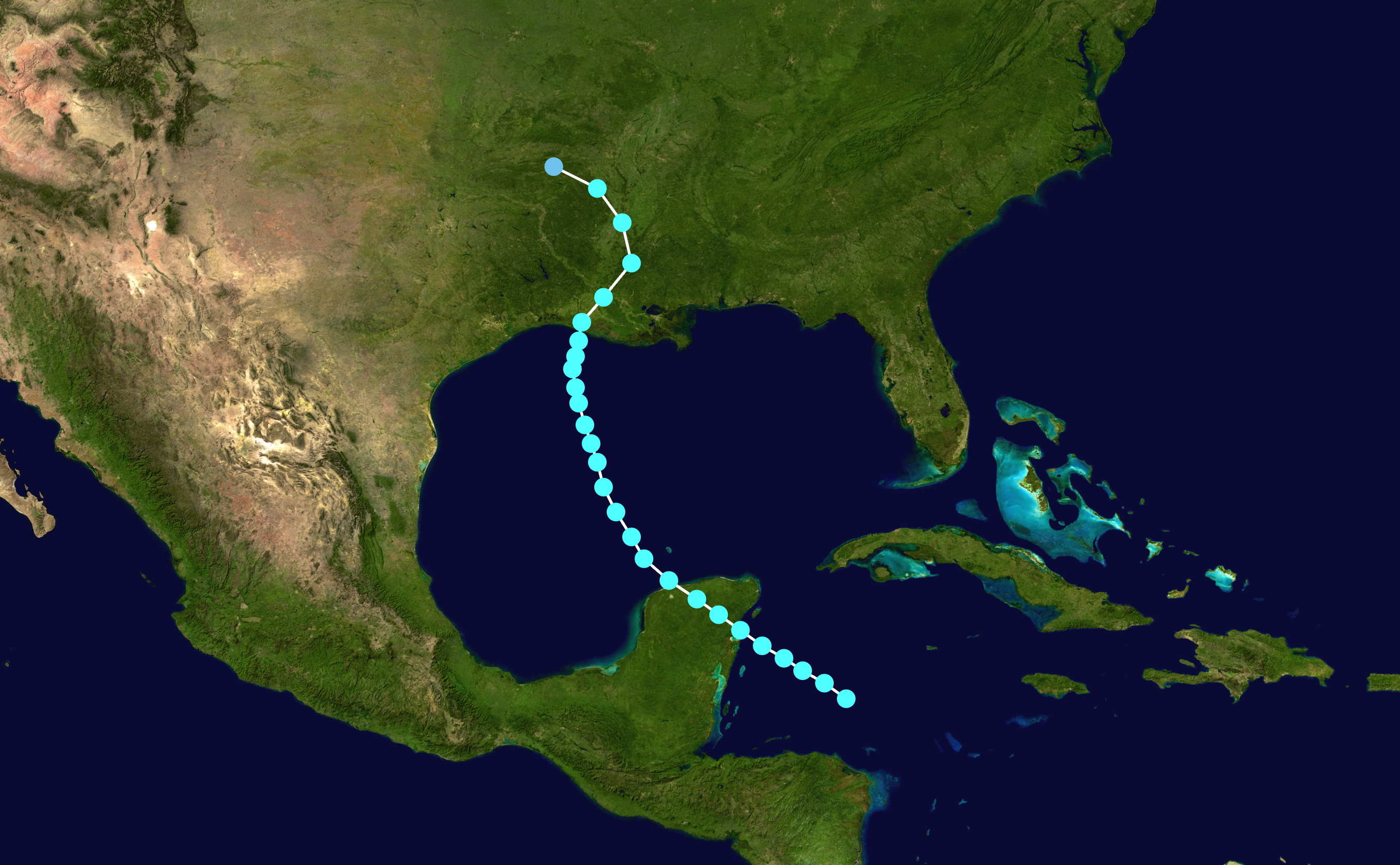
- Duration: September 24 – September 30
- Peak intensity: 50 mph (85 km/h) (1-min); <1000 mbar (hPa)

Based on weather reports from the Weather Bureau Office in New Orleans, Louisiana, a tropical storm was first observed about 20 miles (30 km) north-northwest of Swan Island on September 24. The storm strengthened slightly before making landfall near Punta Allen, Quintana Roo, around 1200 UTC on September 25. Early on the following day, the system emerged into the Gulf of Mexico and headed north-northwestward. At midday on September 26, it peaked with sustained winds of 50 mph (85 km/h). The storm re-curved north-northeastward late on September 28, while approaching the Gulf Coast of the United States. At 1000 UTC the next day, this system made landfall in extreme southwest Vermilion Parish, Louisiana at the same intensity. The storm slowly weakened inland and dissipated over Arkansas on September 30.

Strong winds and rough seas were reported along the central Gulf Coast of the United States, forcing ships to remain in port. However, rough seas beached many other vessels and washed away some bathhouses and waterfront buildings south of New Orleans. In Gulfport, Mississippi, storm tides inundated the railroad wharves.

=== Hurricane Four ===
- Category 3 hurricane (SSHWS)
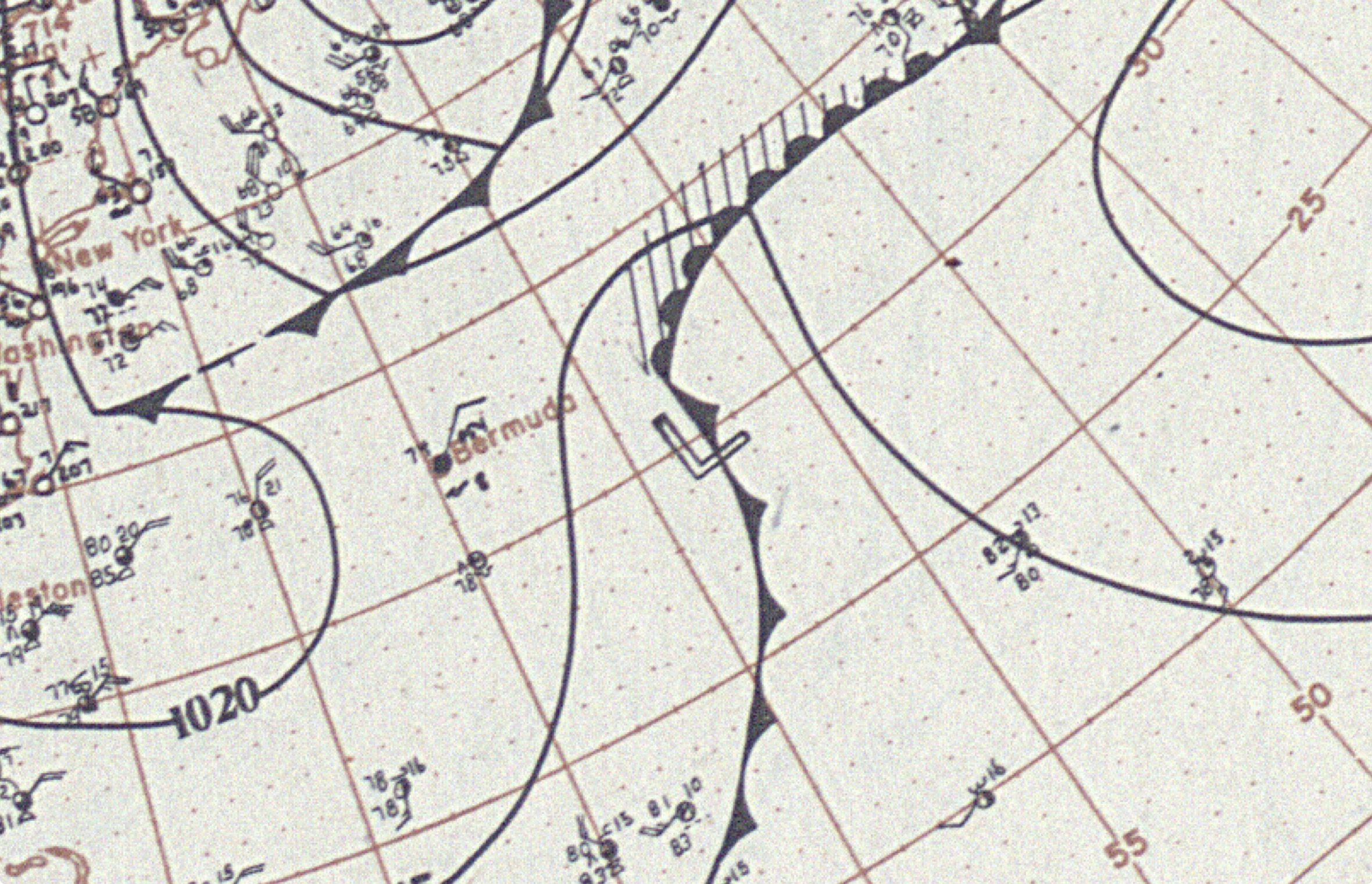
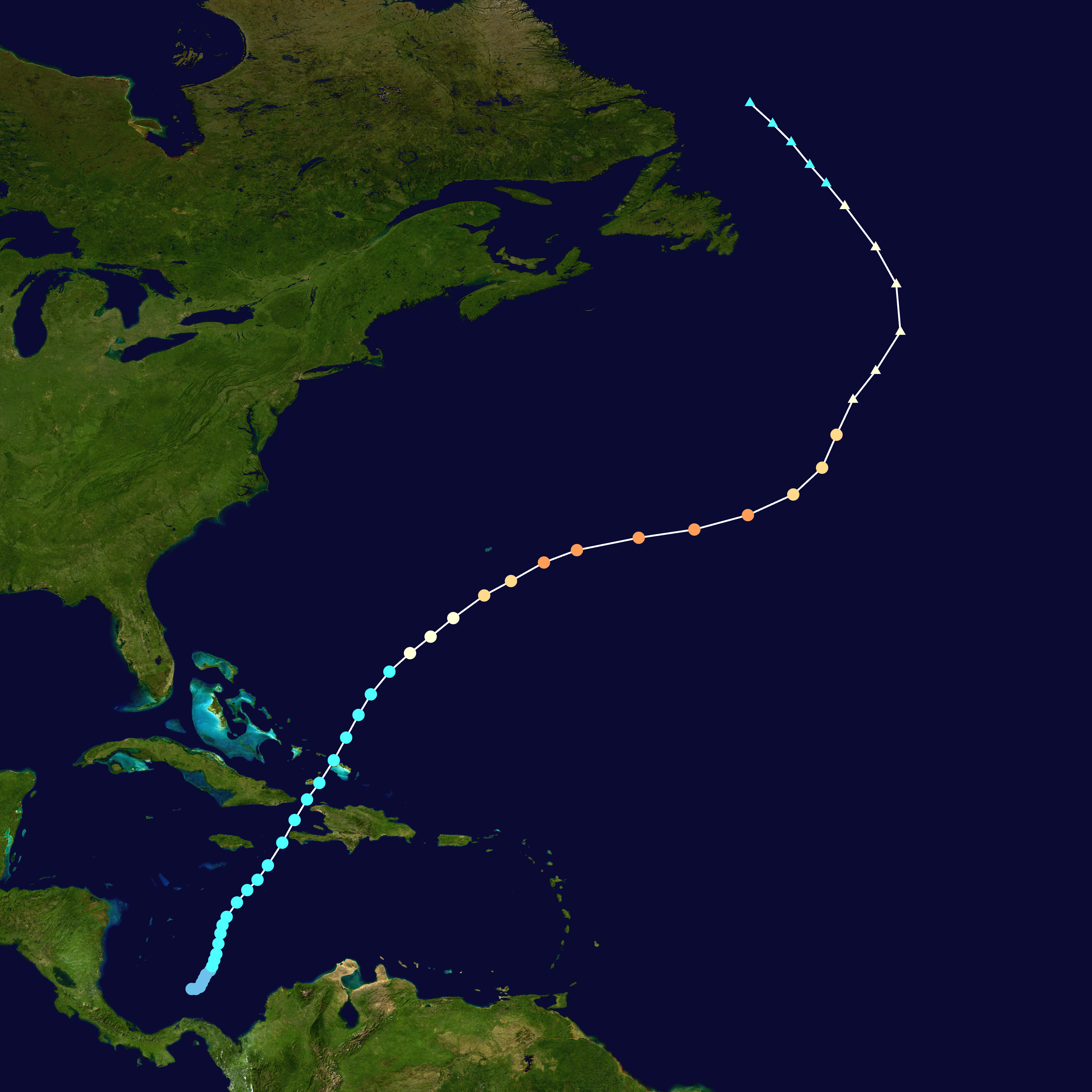
- Duration: October 1 – October 11
- Peak intensity: 120 mph (195 km/h) (1-min);

On October 1, a tropical depression developed in the southwestern Caribbean Sea. Moving slowly north-northeastward, it reached tropical storm status early on October 3. The following day, the storm curved northeastward. Kingston, Jamaica, recorded rainfall as the system bypassed the island. Late on October 5 and early on October 6, the storm passed through the Windward Passage. Eastern Cuba was affected "with some force", but damage was not significant. Entering the Atlantic Ocean, the system passed through the southeastern Bahamas and Turks and Caicos Islands without causing damage. While centered about halfway between Bermuda and Turks and Caicos Islands, the storm strengthened into a Category 1 hurricane on the Saffir–Simpson hurricane wind scale.

Later on October 8, it deepened to a Category 2 hurricane, while passing south of Bermuda. The island experienced gale-force winds with gusts reaching hurricane force, but damage was apparently minimal. Early on October 9, the storm intensified into a Category 3 hurricane and peaked with winds of 120 mph (195 km/h). On October 10, it weakened to a Category 2 and then became extratropical early the next day. The steamer Campania encountered the remnants of the storm and was reported to have been struck by a large rogue wave, which was described as "disastrous." The ship roll and water moved across the steerage, sweeping five passengers into the ocean, they presumably drowned. At least 30 other people were injured, one of them fatally. The extratropical remnants dissipated over the Labrador Sea on October 13.

=== Tropical Storm Five ===
- Tropical storm (SSHWS)
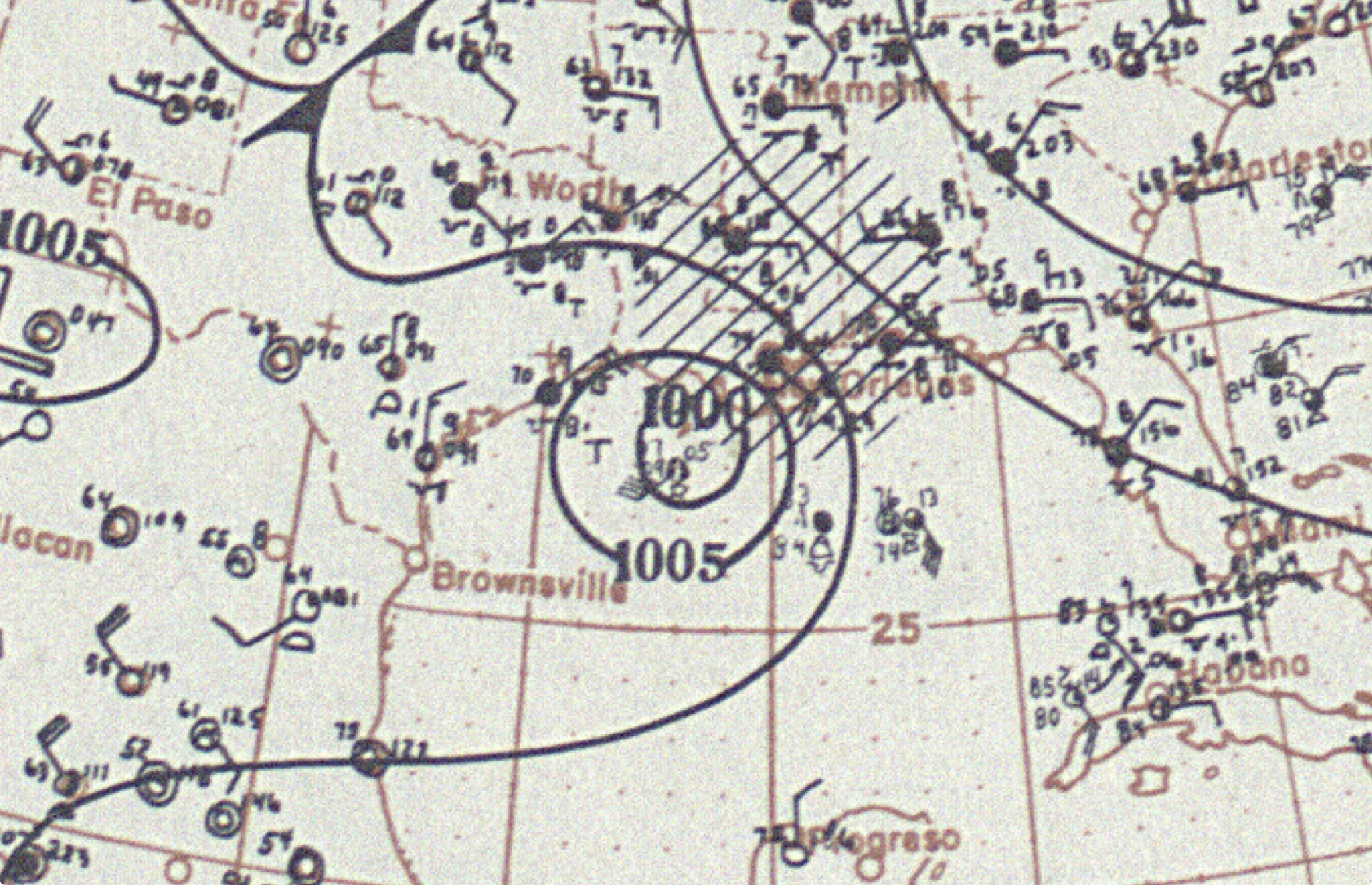
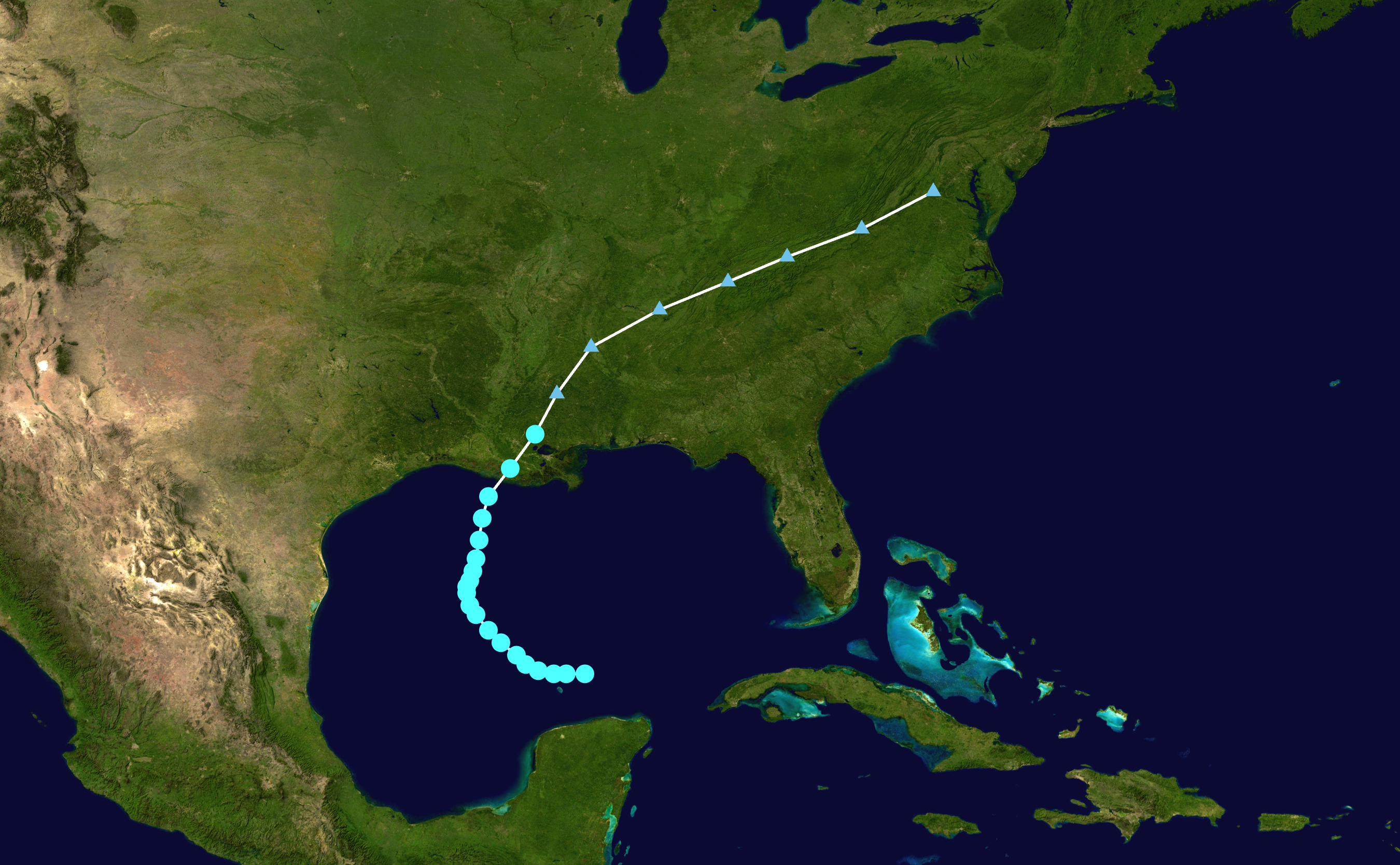
- Duration: October 5 – October 10
- Peak intensity: 50 mph (85 km/h) (1-min); <1003 mbar (hPa)

A tropical storm was first observed in the Gulf of Mexico on October 5, while located about 105 miles (170 km) north of the Yucatán Peninsula. The storm strengthened slowly while crossing the Gulf of Mexico and peaked with sustained winds of 50 mph (85 km/h) early on October 8. At 1700 UTC on the following day, it made landfall near Morgan City, Louisiana, at the same intensity. The system quickly weakened inland and transitioned into an extratropical cyclone over Mississippi on October 10. The extratropical remnants dissipated over Virginia on October 11. The remnants of this storm brought heavy rains to the Eastern United States and Atlantic Canada.

== Season effects ==
This is a table of all of the storms that have formed in the 1905 Atlantic hurricane season. It includes their duration, names, landfall(s)–denoted by bold location names – damages, and death totals. Deaths in parentheses are additional and indirect (an example of an indirect death would be a traffic accident), but were still related to that storm. Damage and deaths include totals while the storm was extratropical, a wave, or a low, and all of the damage figures are in 1905 USD.

Saffir–Simpson scale
TD	TS	C1	C2	C3	C4	C5

1905 North Atlantic tropical cyclone season statistics
Storm name	Dates active	Storm category at peak intensity	Max 1-min wind mph (km/h)	Min. press. (mbar)	Areas affected	Damage (US$)	Deaths	Ref(s).
One	September 6–8	Tropical storm	60 (95)	Unknown	Windward Islands	Unknown	2	
Two	September 11–16	Tropical storm	60 (95)	Unknown	None	None	None	
Three	September 24–30	Tropical storm	50 (85)	1000	Mexico, Gulf Coast of the United States (Louisiana)	Minor	None	
Four	October 1–11	Category 3 hurricane	120 (195)	Unknown	Greater Antilles, Bahamas, Turks and Caicos Islands, Bermuda	Unknown	6	
Five	October 5–10	Tropical storm	50 (85)	1003	Louisiana, Eastern United States, Atlantic Canada	None	None	
Season aggregates
5 systems	September 6 – October 10		120 (195)	Unknown		Unknown	8	

== See also ==
- 1900–1940 South Pacific cyclone seasons
- 1900–1950 South-West Indian Ocean cyclone seasons
- 1900s Australian region cyclone seasons
