= 1900s North Indian Ocean cyclone seasons =

The following is a list of North Indian Ocean tropical cyclones from 1900 to 1909. Records from before the 1970s were extremely unreliable, and storms that stayed at sea were often only reported by ship reports.

== 1902 ==
- In May 1902, a cyclonic storm struck the coast in the vicinity of Karachi.
- Five cyclones formed in the Arabian Sea, the most on record (tied with 2019)

== 1907 ==
- In June 1907, a tropical storm struck the coast near Karachi.

== See also ==
- 1900s Australian region cyclone seasons
- 1900–1940 South Pacific cyclone seasons
- 1900–1950 South-West Indian Ocean cyclone seasons
- Atlantic hurricane seasons: 1900, 1901, 1902, 1903, 1904, 1905, 1906, 1907, 1908, 1909
- Eastern Pacific hurricane seasons: 1900, 1901, 1902, 1903, 1904, 1905, 1906, 1907, 1908, 1909
- Western Pacific typhoon seasons: 1900, 1901, 1902, 1903, 1904, 1905, 1906, 1907, 1908, 1909
