= 1900–1950 South-West Indian Ocean cyclone seasons =

Cyclone season in the Southwest Indian Ocean

The following is a list of South-West Indian Ocean tropical cyclones between the year 1900 and 1950.

== Storms ==
=== 1904 Comoros cyclone ===
On December 14, a cyclone moved through the Comoros, causing damage to the island's vanilla and coffee plantations. Crop production declined by 9% as a result of the storm, causing food shortages after little rainfall in 1905.

=== 1905 Comoros cyclone ===
On December 16, 1905, another cyclone moved struck the island group just a year after previous cyclone, killing 30 people and injuring 150. Responding to the two cyclones, the French government provided Fr.360,000 to the island group toward rebuilding and assistance for residents.

=== March 1927 cyclone ===
Considered the strongest to strike Madagascar for at least 67 years, a cyclone hit the eastern portion of the country on March 3, potentially causing as many as 500 deaths.

=== Cyclone of 1948 ===
On January 22, a tropical disturbance formed northeast of Mauritius. Initially it moved to the southwest, but turned to the south on January 26. The next day, the storm passed just west of Réunion with winds estimated at 300 km/h (187 mph), and later dissipated on January 28. The storm killed about 100 people and injured hundreds. About 60% of the island's houses were damaged or destroyed, and about 70% of the crops were destroyed.

== See also ==
- South-West Indian Ocean tropical cyclone
- 1900–1940 South Pacific cyclone seasons

=== 1900s ===
- Atlantic hurricane seasons: 1900, 1901, 1902, 1903, 1904, 1905, 1906, 1907, 1908, 1909
- Eastern Pacific hurricane seasons: 1900, 1901, 1902, 1903, 1904, 1905, 1906, 1907, 1908, 1909
- Western Pacific typhoon seasons: 1900, 1901, 1902, 1903, 1904, 1905, 1906, 1907, 1908, 1909
- North Indian Ocean cyclone seasons: 1900, 1901, 1902, 1903, 1904, 1905, 1906, 1907, 1908, 1909

=== 1910s ===
- Atlantic hurricane seasons: 1910, 1911, 1912, 1913, 1914, 1915, 1916, 1917, 1918, 1919
- Eastern Pacific hurricane seasons: 1910, 1911, 1912, 1913, 1914, 1915, 1916, 1917, 1918, 1919
- Western Pacific typhoon seasons: 1910, 1911, 1912, 1913, 1934, 1915, 1916, 1917, 1918, 1919
- North Indian Ocean cyclone seasons: 1910, 1911, 1912, 1913, 1914, 1915, 1916, 1917, 1918, 1919

=== 1920s ===
- Atlantic hurricane seasons: 1920, 1921, 1922, 1923, 1924, 1925, 1926, 1927, 1928, 1929
- Eastern Pacific hurricane seasons: 1920, 1921, 1922, 1923, 1924, 1925, 1926, 1927, 1928, 1929
- Western Pacific typhoon seasons: 1920, 1921, 1922, 1923, 1924, 1925, 1926, 1927, 1928, 1929
- North Indian Ocean cyclone seasons: 1920, 1921, 1922, 1923, 1924, 1925, 1926, 1927, 1928, 1929

=== 1930s ===
- Atlantic hurricane seasons: 1930, 1931, 1932, 1933, 1934, 1935, 1936, 1937, 1938, 1939
- Eastern Pacific hurricane seasons: 1930, 1931, 1932, 1933, 1934, 1935, 1936, 1937, 1938, 1939
- Western Pacific typhoon seasons: 1930, 1931, 1932, 1933, 1934, 1935, 1936, 1937, 1938, 1939
- North Indian Ocean cyclone seasons: 1930, 1931, 1932, 1933, 1934, 1935, 1936, 1937, 1928, 1939

=== 1940s ===
- Atlantic hurricane seasons: 1940, 1941, 1942, 1943, 1944, 1945, 1946, 1947, 1948, 1949
- Eastern Pacific hurricane seasons: 1940, 1941, 1942, 1943, 1944, 1945, 1946, 1947, 1948, 1949
- Western Pacific typhoon seasons: 1940, 1941, 1942, 1943, 1944, 1945, 1946, 1947, 1948, 1949
- North Indian Ocean cyclone seasons: 1940, 1941, 1942, 1943, 1944, 1945, 1946, 1947, 1948, 1949
