= 1907 Atlantic hurricane season =

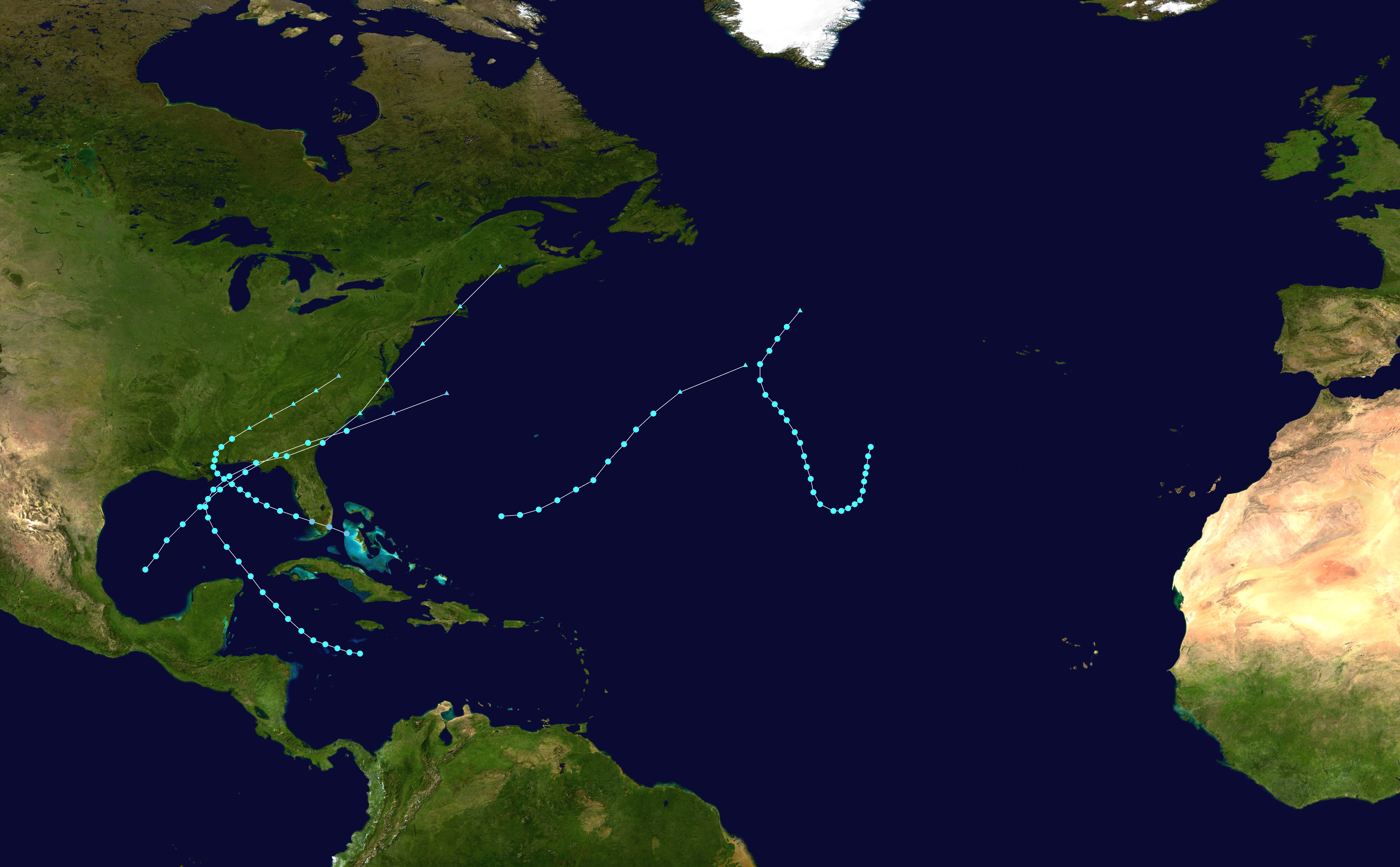
- Season summary map

Seasonal boundaries
- First system formed: June 24, 1907
- Last system dissipated: November 12, 1907

Strongest storm
- Name: One
  - Maximum winds: 65 mph (100 km/h) (1-minute sustained)
  - Lowest pressure: 1002 mbar (hPa; 29.59 inHg)

Seasonal statistics
- Total depressions: 5
- Total storms: 5
- Hurricanes: 0 (record low – tied with 1914)
- Major hurricanes (Cat. 3+): 0
- Total fatalities: None
- Total damage: Unknown

Related articles
- 1900–09 Pacific hurricane seasons; 1902–19 Pacific typhoon seasons; 1900s North Indian Ocean cyclone seasons

The 1907 Atlantic hurricane season was an extremely inactive hurricane season. Only five tropical storms formed, none of them reaching hurricane strength. This season is one of only two that did not produce any hurricanes (the other being 1914). Of the season's storms, three made landfall, all of them on the Gulf Coast of the United States. The first storm of the season formed on June 24, while the final dissipated on November 12. Damage from the storms was minimal, and no deaths were reported. Due to the lack of modern technology, including satellite imagery, information is often sparse, and four additional systems could have formed during the season. Documentation of the four possible storms exist, although it has not been proven that these systems were fully tropical.

== Season summary ==
Prior to the advent of modern tropical cyclone tracking technology, notably satellite imagery, many hurricanes that did not affect land directly went unnoticed, and storms that did affect land were not recognized until their onslaught. As a result, information on older hurricane seasons was often incomplete. Modern-day efforts have been made and are still ongoing to reconstruct the tracks of known hurricanes and to identify initially undetected storms. In many cases, the only evidence that a hurricane existed was reports from ships in its path, and judging by the direction of winds experienced by ships, and their location in relation to the storm, it is possible to roughly pinpoint the storm's center of circulation for a given point in time. This is the manner in which all of the five known storms in the 1907 season were identified by hurricane expert José Fernández-Partagás's reanalysis of hurricane seasons between 1851 and 1910. Partagás also extended the known tracks of three other hurricanes previously identified by scholars. The information Partagás and his colleague uncovered was largely adopted by the National Oceanic and Atmospheric Administration's Atlantic hurricane reanalysis in their updates to the Atlantic hurricane database (HURDAT), with some slight adjustments. HURDAT is the official source for such hurricane data as track and intensity, although due to a sparsity of available records at the time the storms existed, listings on some storms are incomplete.

The season was one of only two Atlantic seasons without a storm of hurricane intensity (winds of 75 mph (120 km/h) or higher), the other being the 1914 season. In addition, the maximum winds recorded from the first tropical storm were also the highest of the season; it also broke the record for the weakest "most intense" storm on record for an Atlantic hurricane season. Reanalysis also indicated that four additional systems could have developed during the season. No deaths occurred during the season and damage was minimal.

The season's activity was reflected with an accumulated cyclone energy (ACE) rating of 13.06, the third lowest total since the beginning of HURDAT records in 1851. ACE is a metric used to express the energy used by a tropical cyclone during its lifetime. Therefore, a storm with a longer duration will have high values of ACE. It is only calculated at six-hour increments in which specific tropical and subtropical systems are either at or above sustained wind speeds of 39 mph (63 km/h), which is the threshold for tropical storm intensity. Thus, tropical depressions are not included here.

== Systems ==
=== Tropical Storm One ===
- Tropical storm (SSHWS)
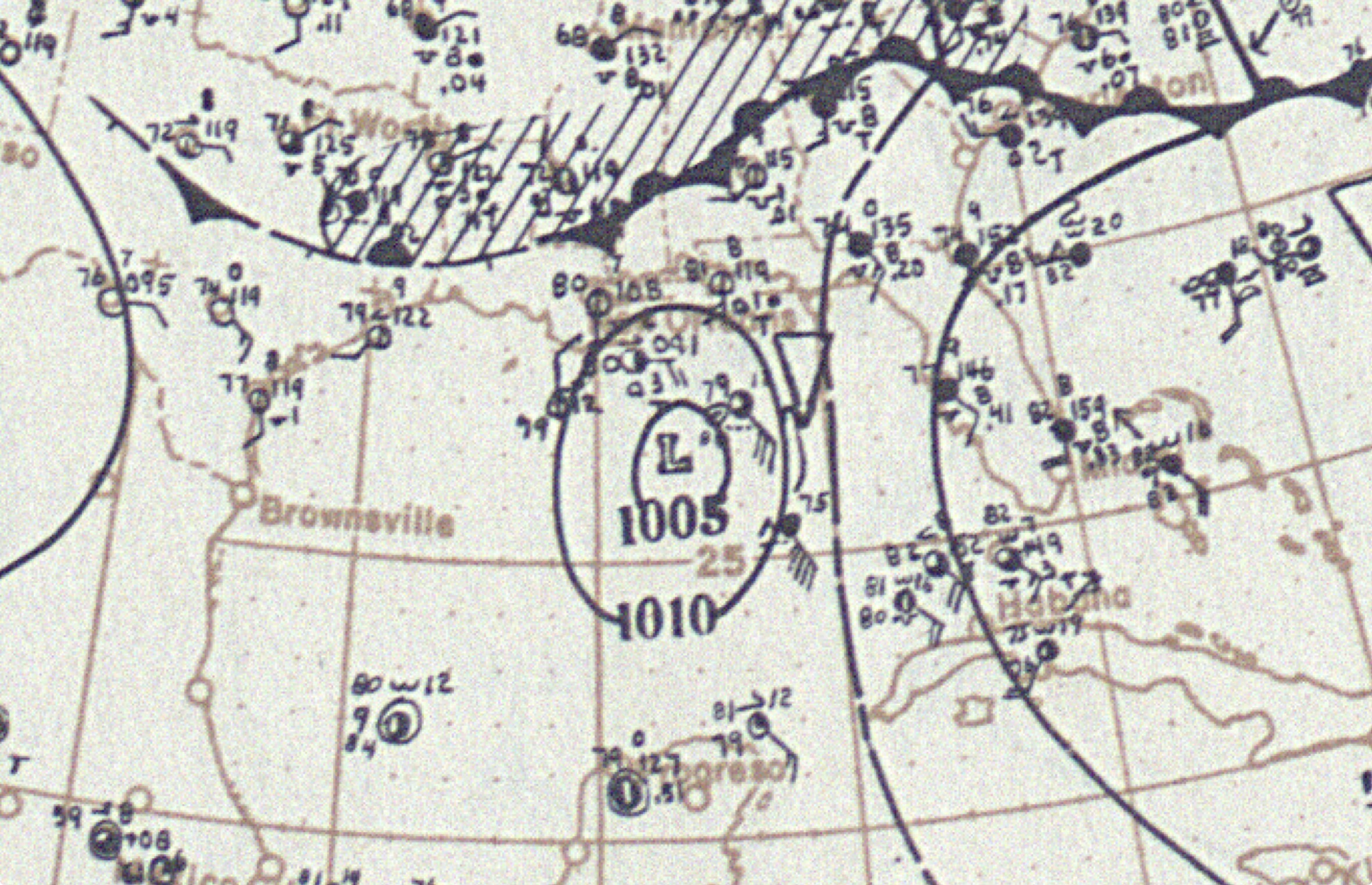
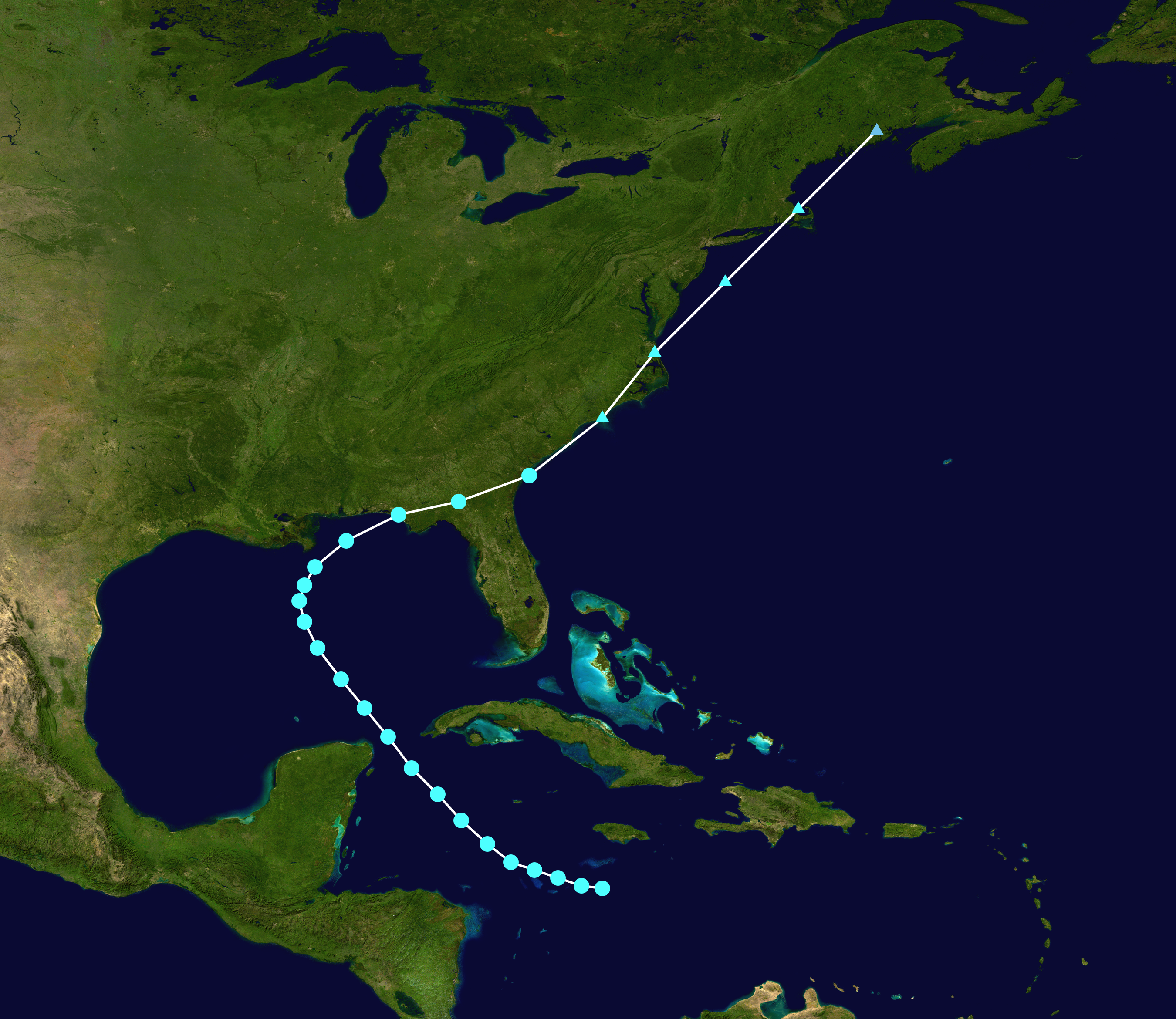
- Duration: June 24 – June 29
- Peak intensity: 65 mph (100 km/h) (1-min); <1002 mbar (hPa)

The first identified tropical storm of the season is listed in the Atlantic hurricane database as having formed on June 24, positioned in the western Caribbean; the estimate for this location was based on ship reports, although the information was insufficient to guarantee an accurate position. It initially meandered west-northwestward, though began to turn northwest during the latter half of following day. Late on June 26, it passed between the Yucatán Peninsula and Cuba, and subsequently entered the Gulf of Mexico shortly thereafter. The tropical storm continued to slowly intensify, and started to make sharp curve towards the northeast on June 28.

The storm traveled east-northeastward paralleling the Gulf Coast of the United States, and eventually made landfall on the Florida panhandle early on June 29. It weakened slightly as it traversed inland, and entered the Atlantic Ocean just offshore Georgia during the morning. At this point, the storm attained its peak intensity of 65 mph (100 km/h), though it transitioned into an extratropical cyclone within the six hours that followed. Late during the day, the extratropical storm reached New Jersey, and entered Maine on June 30. The 2003 reanalysis made only minor adjustments to the storm's intensity and track created by Partagás and Diaz, which included moving the point of landfall westward and increasing windspeeds on June 29 based on readings received in Jacksonville, Florida.

=== Tropical Storm Two ===
- Tropical storm (SSHWS)
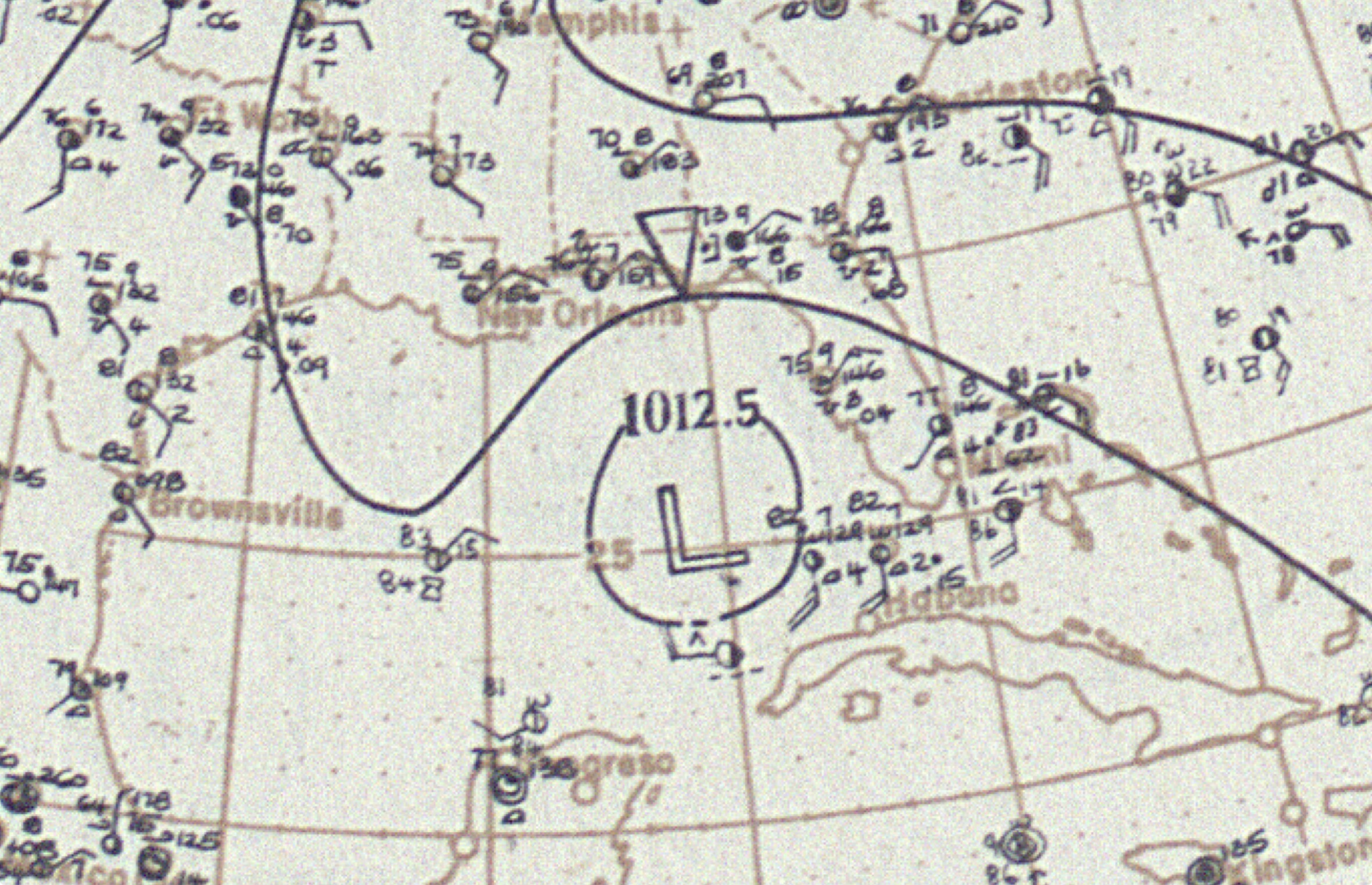
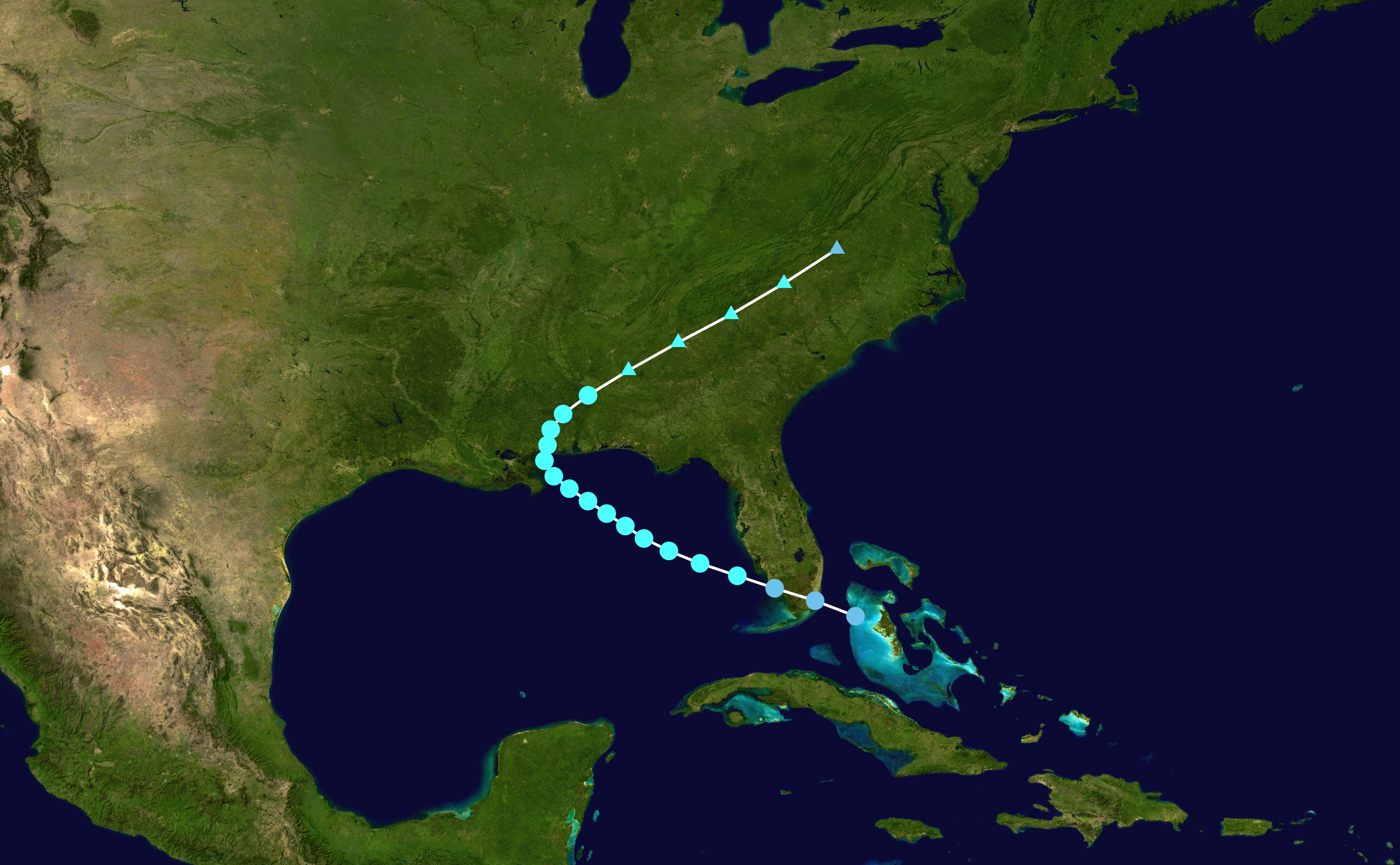
- Duration: September 18 – September 22
- Peak intensity: 45 mph (75 km/h) (1-min); <1003 mbar (hPa)

Based on information from historical weather maps, it appeared that eastward-moving lower-atmospheric flow was present between September 16 and 17, though a closed circulation did not appear to be present. On September 18, the system developed into a tropical depression between the Bahamas and Florida while it moved west-northwestward. After swiftly crossing the southern portion of the state, it strengthened into a tropical storm on September 19 over the southeastern Gulf of Mexico, and attained its peak intensity of 45 mph (75 km/h) early during September 20. It began turning north on September 21, and made landfall on the Mississippi coast on September 22. The storm weakened as it moved inland, and curved east-northeast later during that day, only to transition into an extratropical cyclone shortly thereafter. The storm lost extratropical characteristics over Virginia on September 23. As there were no reports of strong winds near the point of landfall, Partagás had doubt as to whether or not this storm was a tropical storm, as the most intense winds were recorded when the system was classified as extratropical.

=== Tropical Storm Three ===
- Tropical storm (SSHWS)
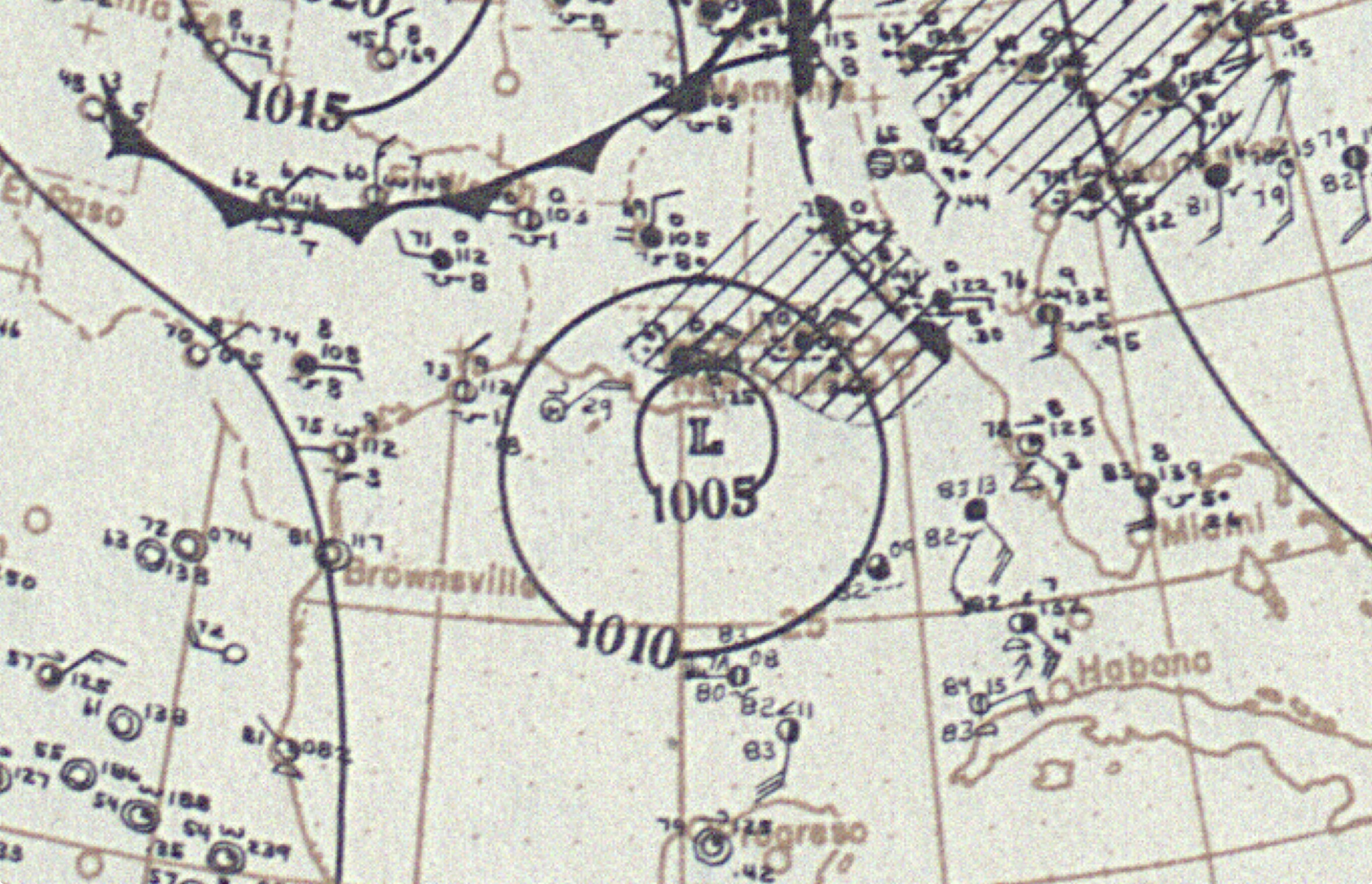
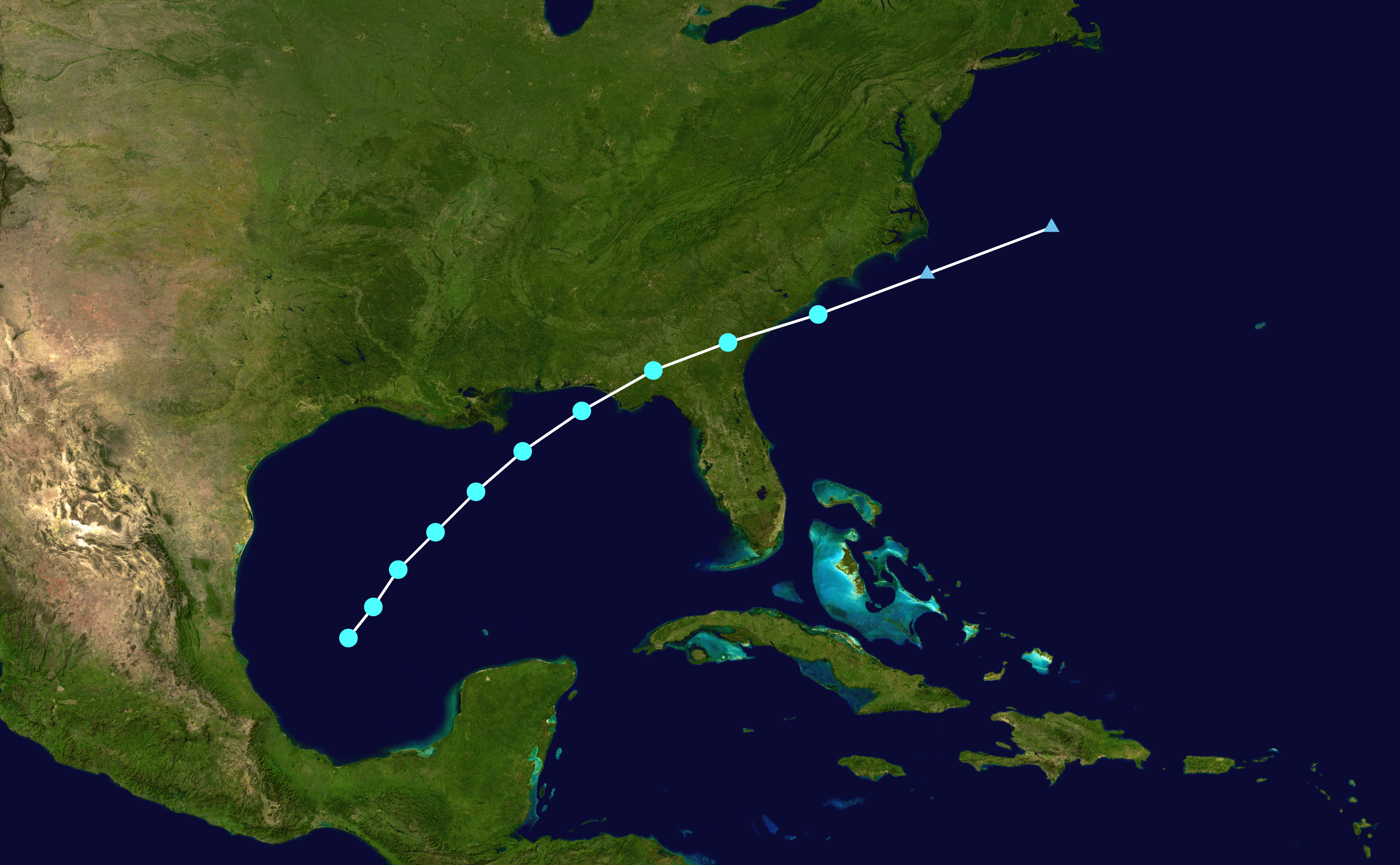
- Duration: September 27 – September 29
- Peak intensity: 50 mph (85 km/h) (1-min); <1005 mbar (hPa)

The system that would eventually develop into a tropical storm was first noted by a ship north-northwest of Veracruz on September 23. It was recognized as a tropical storm on September 27 while it was located above the Bay of Campeche, and moved northeastward, and slowly accelerated as it intensified. By September 28, it was moving east-northeastward at 24 mph (39 km/h), and simultaneously attained its peak intensity of 50 mph (85 km/h). At this point, it remained just offshore the Florida panhandle, and moved inland shortly thereafter on September 29. It plowed through northern Florida and southeastern Georgia while maintaining its intensity and transitioned into an extratropical cyclone off the coast of North Carolina on September 29. The remnants of the storm merged with a cold front the following day while situated south of New York.

Storm warnings were issued on September 28 for the shorelines of Louisiana and Mississippi, but the states did not receive strong winds. The maximum gust from the storm was 46 mph (74 km/h), which was recorded at Pensacola, Florida.

=== Tropical Storm Four ===
- Tropical storm (SSHWS)
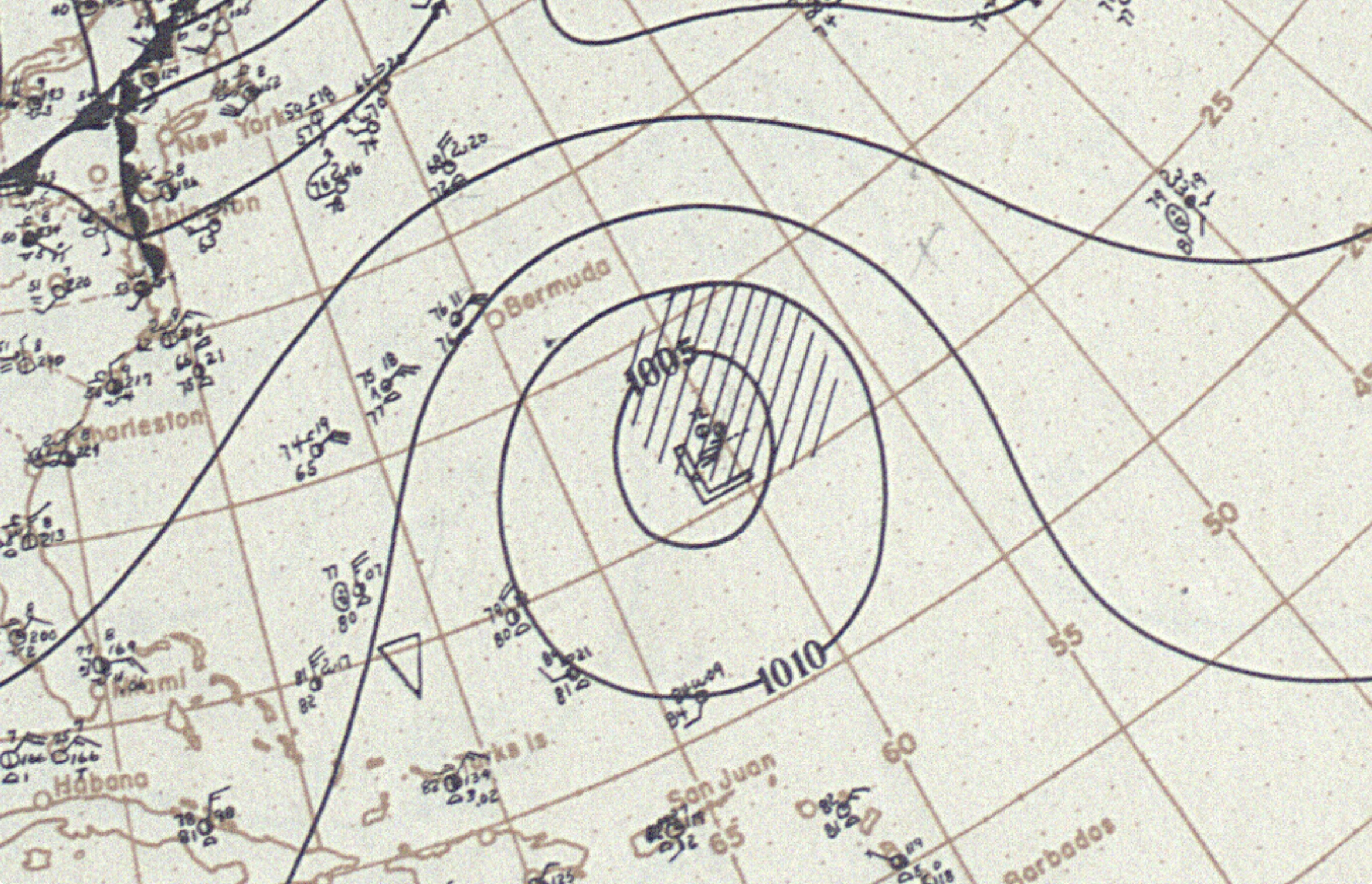
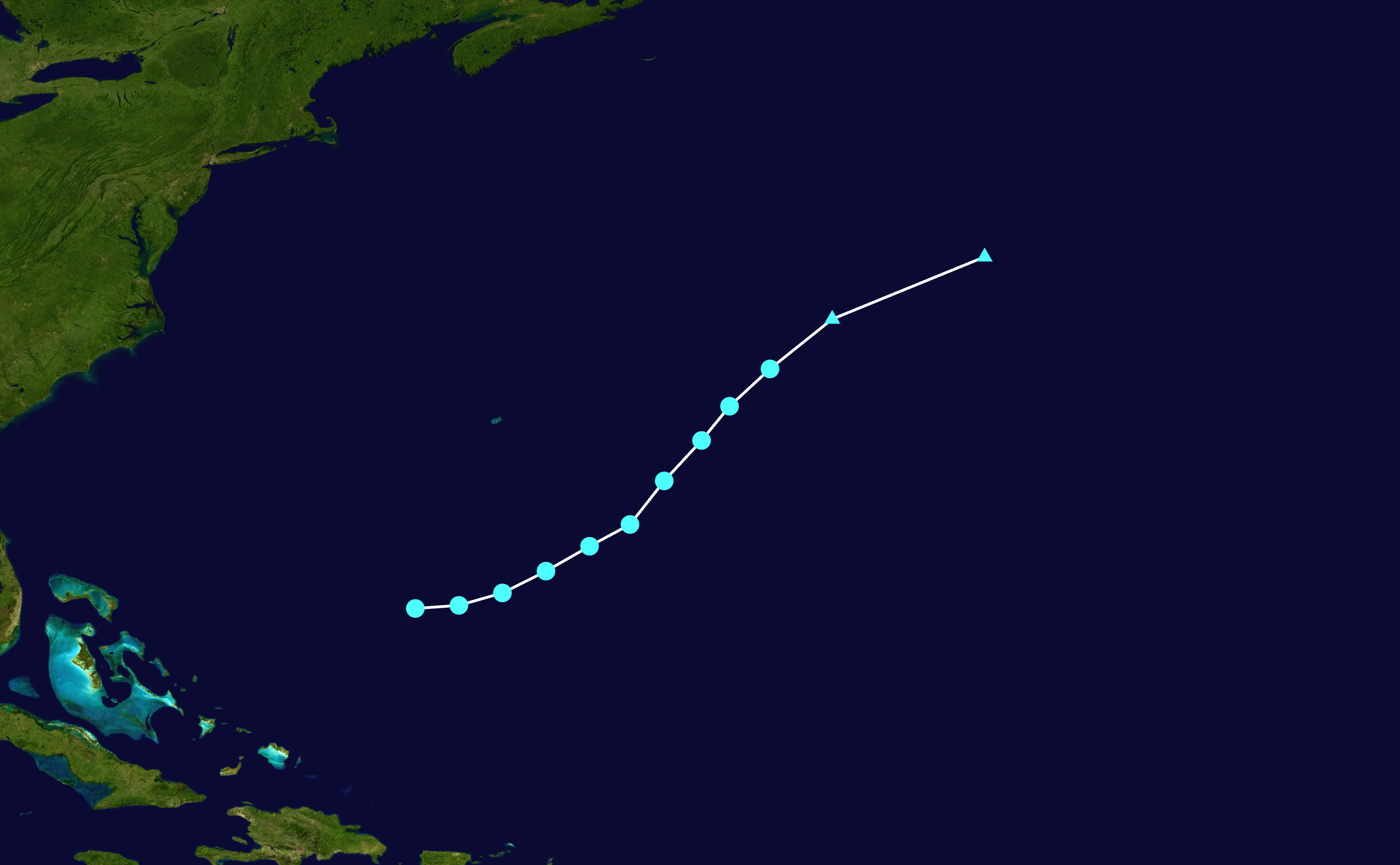
- Duration: October 17 – October 19
- Peak intensity: 50 mph (85 km/h) (1-min); <1003 mbar (hPa)

The fourth tropical storm of the season was first detected by a ship on October 17 southwest of Bermuda; in the HURDAT database, this date was considered to be the formation date, although the entire lifespan of the storm is unknown due to a lack of data on the system itself. It initially moved east-northeastward, though later began to turn northeastward on October 18. The storm curved slightly towards the east-northeast on October 19, and became extratropical later that day before its dissipation on October 20. The storm maintained its peak winds of 50 mph (85 km/h) for most of its lifetime.

=== Tropical Storm Five ===
- Tropical storm (SSHWS)
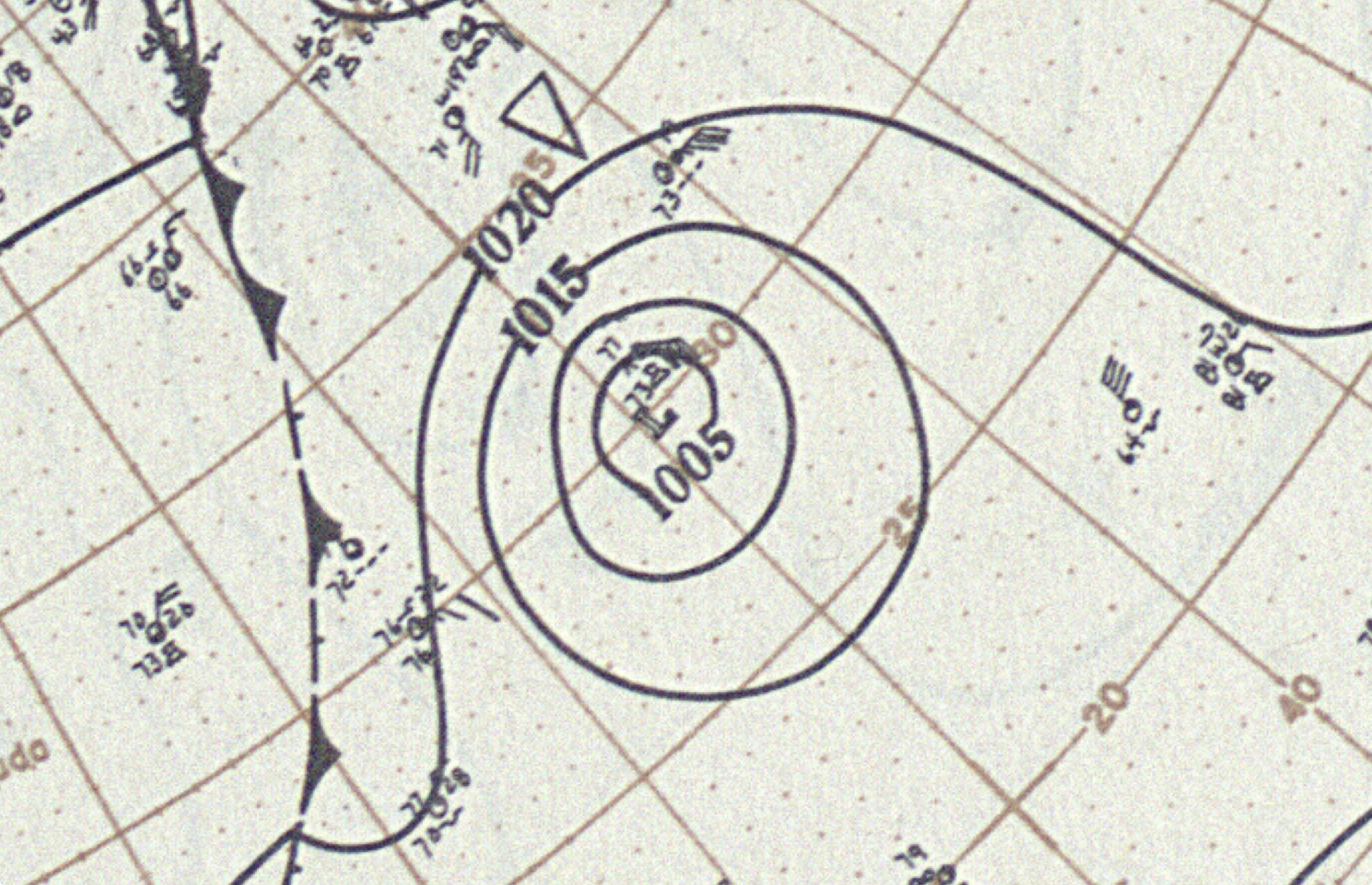
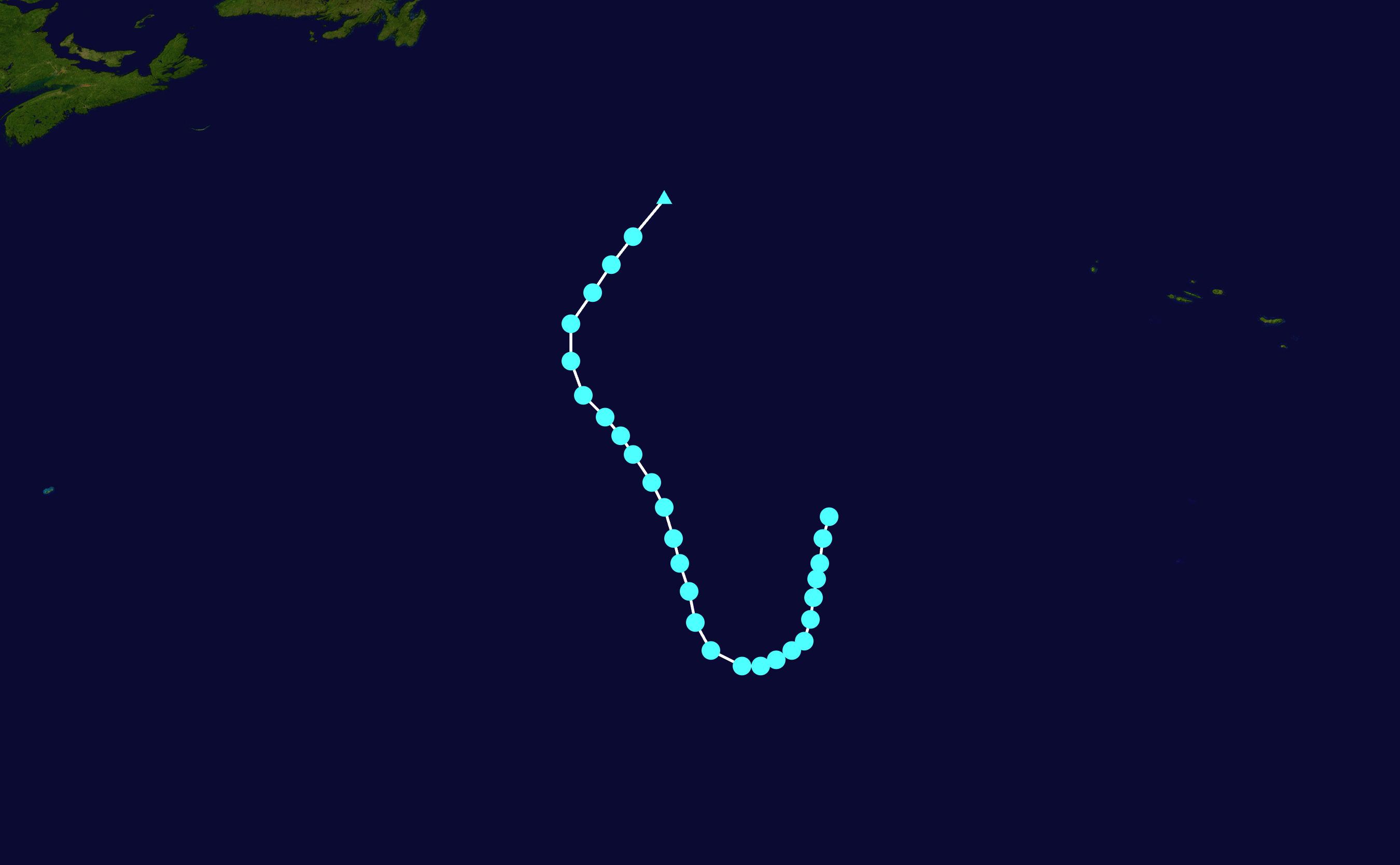
- Duration: November 6 – November 12
- Peak intensity: 45 mph (75 km/h) (1-min);

The final tropical storm of the season was previously unidentified until reanalysis by Partagás. It formed on November 6 while moving south-southwestward, though took a sharp turn towards the west-southwestward on November 7. The following day, it took another sharp turn, this time towards the north-northwest, while it had winds of 45 mph (75 km/h), which were the maximum estimated winds for the storm. It continued on this path until November 11, when it turned once more, this time towards the north-northeast. It evolved into an extratropical cyclone the following day. The storm was considered to be a tropical storm based on reports of unusually warm waters near 70 °F (21 °C) which were accompanied by strong winds.

== See also ==
- 1900–1940 South Pacific cyclone seasons
- 1900–1950 South-West Indian Ocean cyclone seasons
- 1900s Australian region cyclone seasons
