= 1927 Pacific hurricane season =

Seasonal boundaries
- First system formed: June 14, 1927
- Last system dissipated: October 20, 1927

Strongest storm
- Name: Ten
  - Maximum winds: 125 mph (205 km/h)
  - Lowest pressure: 982 mbar (hPa; 29 inHg)

Seasonal statistics
- Total storms: 11
- Hurricanes: 3
- Total fatalities: >1
- Total damage: Unknown

Related articles
- 1927 Atlantic hurricane season; 1927 Pacific typhoon season; 1920s North Indian Ocean cyclone seasons

The 1927 Pacific hurricane season ran through the summer and fall of 1927. Before the satellite age started in the 1960s, data on east Pacific hurricanes was extremely unreliable. Most east Pacific storms were of no threat to land.

== Systems ==
=== Tropical Cyclone One ===
A tropical cyclone moved along the coast of Mexico from June 14 to 18. It had gale-force winds and a minimum reported pressure of 29.58 inHg (100.2 kPa).

=== Tropical Cyclone Two ===
A tropical storm existed off the coast of Mexico during late June. The initial low pressure area formed near the Gulf of Tehuantepec on June 23, moving west-northwest near the coast into July 1.

=== Tropical Cyclone Three ===
A small tropical cyclone was detected on July 1. Its lowest reported pressure was 29.56 inHg (100.1 kPa), and was moving along the coast of Mexico.

=== Tropical Cyclone Four ===
A ship encountered a tropical cyclone on July 5. The ship reported a pressure of 29.70 inHg (100.6 kPa). The cyclone was moving west-northwest.

=== Tropical Cyclone Five ===
On July 28, a tropical cyclone moved eastward in the Gulf of Tehuantepec.

=== Tropical Cyclone Six ===
Roughly southwest of the Gulf of Tehuantepec, a tropical cyclone formed on August 7. It moved along the coast and dissipated south of the entrance to the Gulf of California on August 10.

=== Hurricane Seven ===
On September 6, a tropical cyclone formed south of the Gulf of Tehuantepec. It moved along the coast, and by September 8 it was west of Manzanillo. It entered the Gulf of California on September 10, and it made landfall or dissipated the next day. The lowest reported pressure was 29.15 inHg (98.7 kPa).

The tropical cyclone caused much damage and destruction. The cyclone drove huge waves ashore along the coast, and destroyed rail lines linking Mexico City with the Pacific coast. Some ships were also missing and presumed sunk. Shipping was badly damaged. Some of the ships initially reported sunk were later accounted for. The worst hit areas were Manzanillo and Salina Cruz. Salina Cruz was reduced to ruins. A sudden plunge in the barometer provided enough warning for emergency evacuations in those cities, which were credited with keeping the death toll below that which was initially reported. In Mazatlán, one person was killed by being swept over the sea wall. Acambaro, Guanajuanto was flooded. In the aftermath, displaced refugees attempted to cross the border and enter Nogales, Arizona.

=== Hurricane Eight ===
A "tropical hurricane" formed well southwest of Mexico on September 7, dissipating on September 10.

=== Cyclone Nine ===
A tropical cyclone formed in the Gulf of Tehuantepec on September 11. It moved northwest and was last observed on September 12.

=== Hurricane Ten ===
In the Gulf of Tehuantepec, a tropical cyclone was detected on September 25. It moved along the coast and was last seen on September 30. The lowest reported pressure was 29 inHg (98 kPa); a ship reported a maximum windspeed of 125 miles per hour (201 km/h; 109 kn).

=== Tropical Depression Eleven ===
A tropical depression existed south of Acapulco on October 19 and 20.

== See also ==
- 1927 Atlantic hurricane season
- 1927 Pacific typhoon season
- 1920s North Indian Ocean cyclone seasons
- 1900–1940 South Pacific cyclone seasons
- 1900–1950 South-West Indian Ocean cyclone seasons
- 1920s Australian region cyclone seasons
