= 1901 Pacific typhoon season =

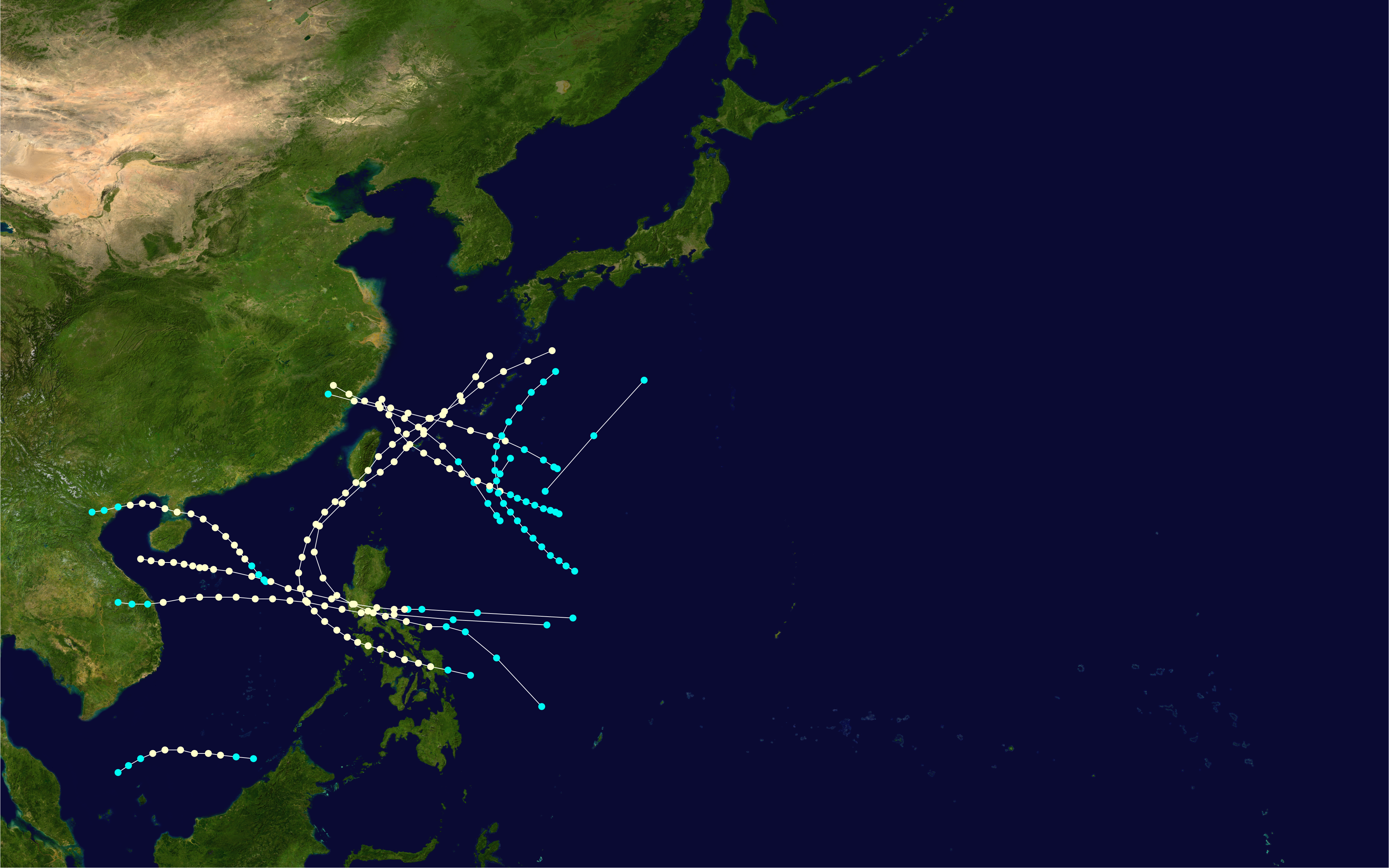
- Season summary map

Seasonal boundaries
- First system formed: January 1901
- Last system dissipated: December 1901

Strongest storm
- Name: "De Witte typhoon"
  - Lowest pressure: 920 hPa (mbar)

Seasonal statistics
- Total storms: 21
- Total fatalities: >4
- Total damage: Unknown

Related articles
- 1901 Atlantic hurricane season; 1900–09 Pacific hurricane seasons; 1900s North Indian Ocean cyclone seasons

In 1901, 21 tropical cyclones were observed in the western Pacific Ocean, north of the equator. In that region of the world, cyclones that attain maximum sustained winds of at least 118 km/h (73 mph) are known as typhoons. Out of the 21 storms, the Hong Kong Observatory tracked nine of them. The strongest storm, known as the De Witte typhoon, reached a minimum barometric pressure of 920 mbar (27 inHg), before striking eastern China.

On May 22, 1901, the Manila Observatory in the Philippines (then a territory of the United States) was renamed the Philippine Weather Bureau, whose successor eventually became the Philippine Atmospheric, Geophysical and Astronomical Services Administration.

== January–July ==
There were two storms tracked in January. On February 2, a storm was observed northwest of Borneo in the South China Sea. It moved to the west and later to the west-southwest, dissipating on February 5 between Borneo and Vietnam. There was a storm in April and another two in May.

On May 14, a tropical cyclone was observed just east of Samar, an island in the east-central Philippines. Estimated to have reached typhoon intensity, the storm moved westward through the Visayas archipelago, producing a barometric pressure of 971 mbar (28.7 inHg) aboard a ship. The storm curved northeastward in the South China Sea, striking Taiwan on May 20. The storm proceeded through the Ryukyu Islands and was last noted on May 23.

There were two storms in June. The first was observed on June 1 into the following day, moving northeastward while remaining east of Taiwan. A typhoon formed east of Luzon on July 12. It moved westward, crossing Cagayan and Ilocos before entering the South China Sea. The system intensified and crossed Hainan, ultimately making landfall on northern Vietnam on July 16, where it soon dissipated. At Haiphong, winds reached 140 km/h (87 mph), and the minimum pressure fell to 967 mbar (28.6 inHg).

=== De Witte typhoon ===
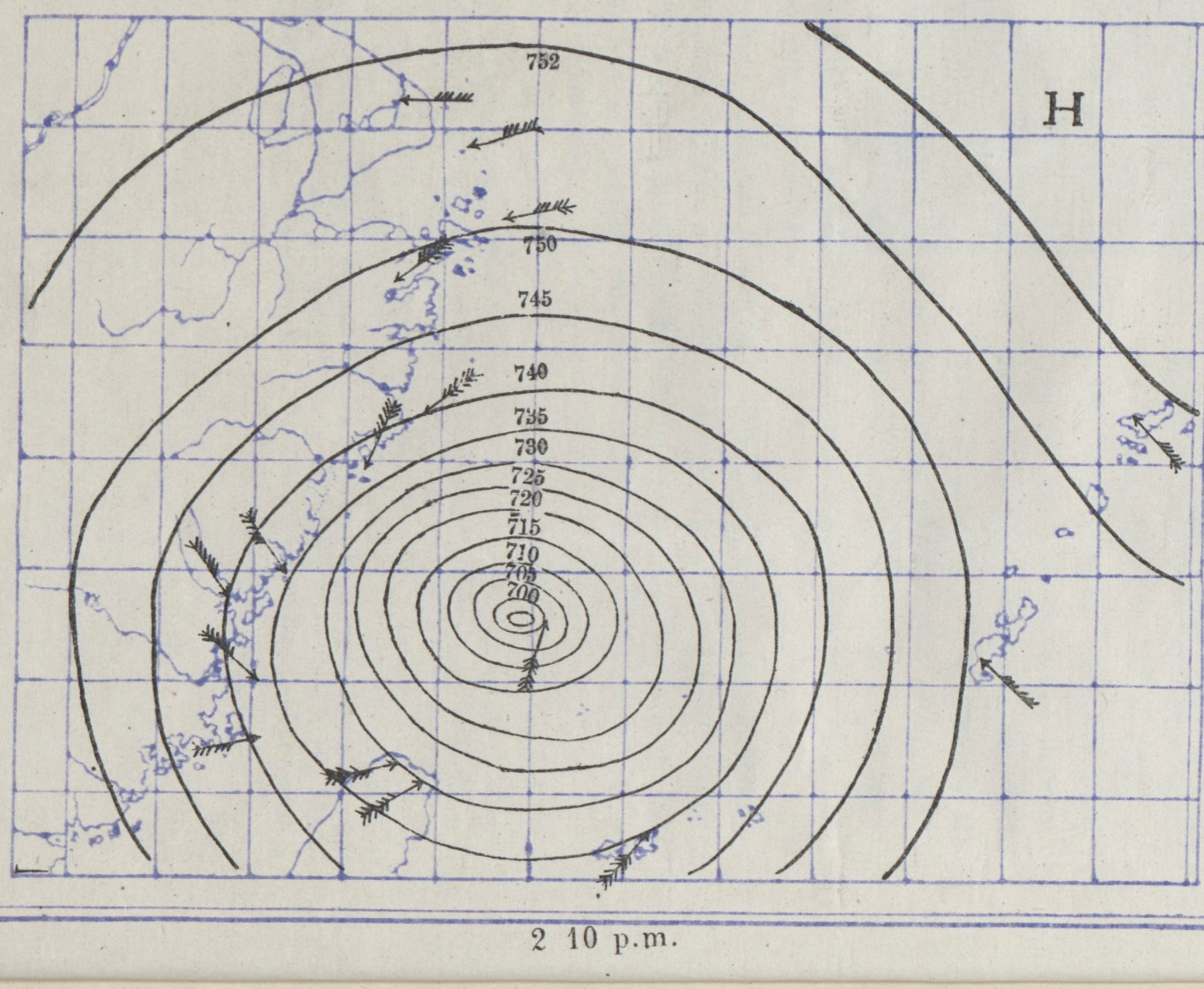
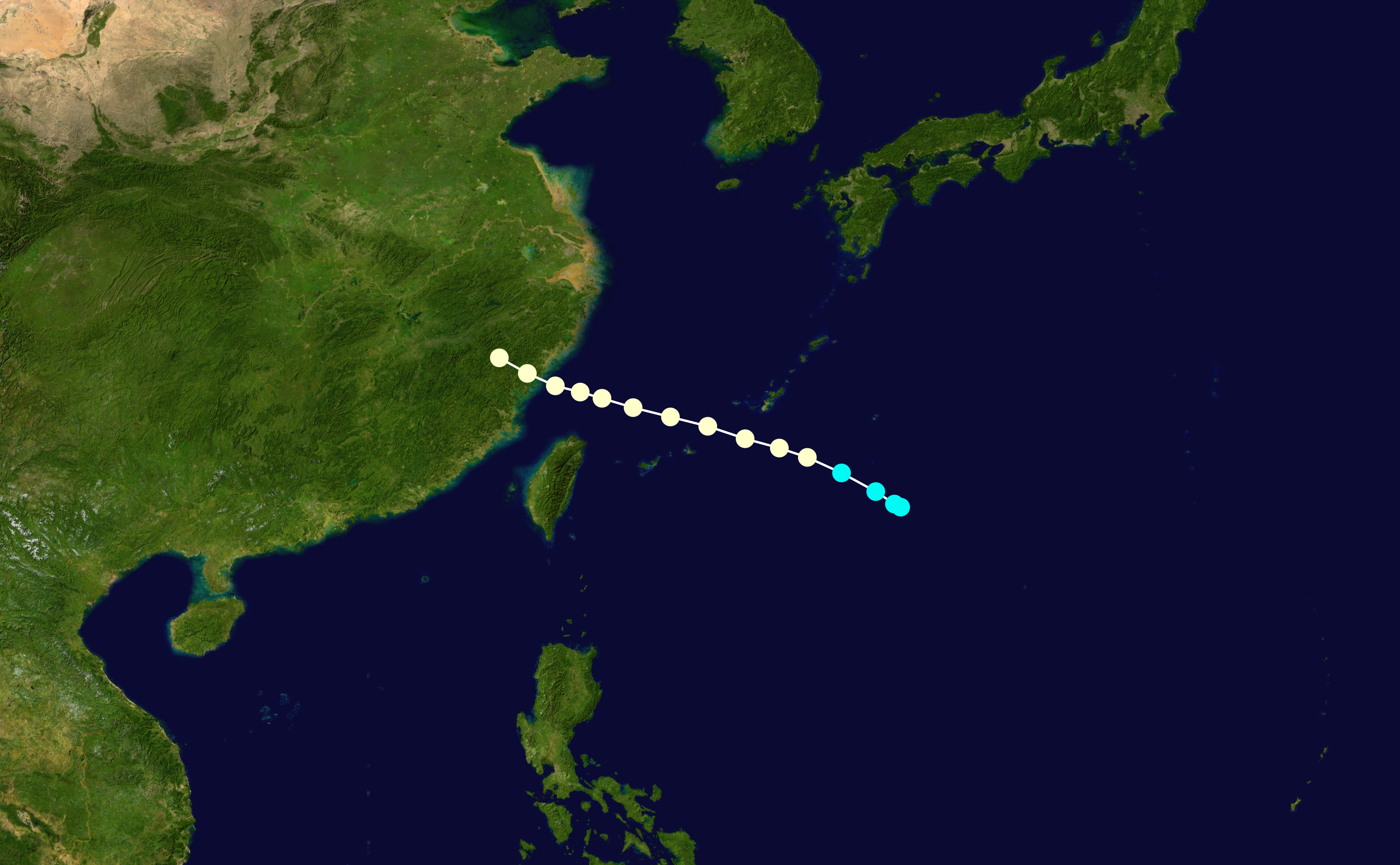
- Duration: July 30 – August 3
- Peak intensity: Winds not specified; 920 hPa (mbar)

Originating near the Caroline Islands, a typhoon was observed on July 30 to the southeast of Okinawa. It moved west-northwestward, entering the East China Sea on August 1. That day, the Russian steamer De Witte encountered the typhoon's rough waves and high winds, which damaged the ship's railings. On August 2, while the ship was about 80 km (50 mi) north of Taiwan, a large wave washed overboard and flooded the engine room; this forced the crew to evacuate into two boats, and after two days they were rescued. Known as the De Witte typhoon, the storm continued to intensify until reaching a peak late on August 2, when a minimum barometric pressure of 920 mbar (27 inHg) was recorded. At its peak, the typhoon had an elliptical 13 km (8 mi) eye, moving west-northwestward at 11 to 24 km/h (7 to 15 mph), with gale-force winds extending 565 km (351 mi) from the center. On August 3, the storm struck eastern China, near the border of Chekiang and Hokkien provinces. It rapidly weakened and dissipated over land. The trajectory of the storm and nearby stations provided an opportunity to study the mechanics of intense tropical cyclones' movements.

Ishigaki Island, part of the Ryukyu Islands, recorded peak winds of 60 km/h (37 mph) while the storm passed to the north. In addition to wrecking the De Witte, the typhoon also damaged two other boats. Onshore mainland China, the typhoon flooded the region around Wenzhou several miles inland due to increased levels along the Ou River. On Lingkun Dao near the city, the storm destroyed an embankment, killing many people. Regional officials later provided coffins for the deceased, as well as rice and money for survivors. Heavy damage occurred around Wenzhou.

== August–December ==
A tropical cyclone was observed in the South China Sea on August 15. It moved northwestward and struck the Leizhou Peninsula in southern China on August 18. The storm turned to the west and crossed the northern Gulf of Tonkin, hitting northern Vietnam and dissipating on August 20. Another storm was first detected northeast of Luzon on August 21. A northwest trajectory brought the system through the Ryukyu Islands, and the storm ultimately dissipated over eastern China on August 24, having moved ashore near Wenzhou.

On September 8, a low pressure area formed east of the Philippines. It intensified into a tropical storm while moving to the northwest, passing near the Ryukyu Islands on September 17. After bypassing Taiwan to the north, the storm approached the mouth of the Yangtze in eastern China, before recurving to the northeast. It was last noted on September 21 in the Sea of Japan. On the last day of the month, a typhoon formed west of Palau. Steered to the northwest, the storm moved across northern Luzon, hitting Nueva Ecija and Pangasinan. After emerging into the South China Sea, the storm turned to the northeast, brushing the Batanes islands as well as southeastern Taiwan on October 4. Crossing the Ryukyu Islands, the storm was last noted on October 6 to the southwest of Kyushu.

A westward-moving tropical cyclone was noticed on October 12 to the east of the Philippines. With wind speeds approaching 269 km/h (167 mph), the typhoon passed north of Polillo Island before crossing Luzon, bypassing Manila about 95 km (59 mi) to the north. Seven boats were wrecked during the height of the storm. Along the Pasig River, a lorcha (Chinese boat) was left adrift after separating from a towboat, causing it to capsize along the breakwater; one person was killed in the incident, while the others swam to safety. Three American soldiers also died in the typhoon, alongside many Filipinos. Considered one of the most severe typhoons in 20 years by newspapers, the storm downed most telegraph lines and damaged many houses. In the capital Manila, most streets were flooded in the Paco district up to a foot deep. Rainfall during the storm reached 4.063 in (103.2 mm). After leaving the Philippines, the typhoon progressed westward into the South China Sea and was last noted on October 18 south of Hainan island.

On October 18, a short-lived tropical cyclone existed east of the Ryukyu Islands. It was moving northeastward and was last noted on the next day. A tropical storm was first observed on October 21 and moved westward through the Philippines over the succeeding days. It crossed the South China Sea and dissipated over east-central Vietnam on October 26. Concurrently, a tropical cyclone was noted on October 24 northeast of the Philippines. It curved northwestward and later turned to the northeast, and was last noted on October 29 east of Okinawa.

There was one additional storm in October, and one each in November and December.

== See also ==
- 1901 Atlantic hurricane season
- 1900–09 Pacific hurricane seasons
- 1900s North Indian Ocean cyclone seasons
