= 1902 Pacific typhoon season =

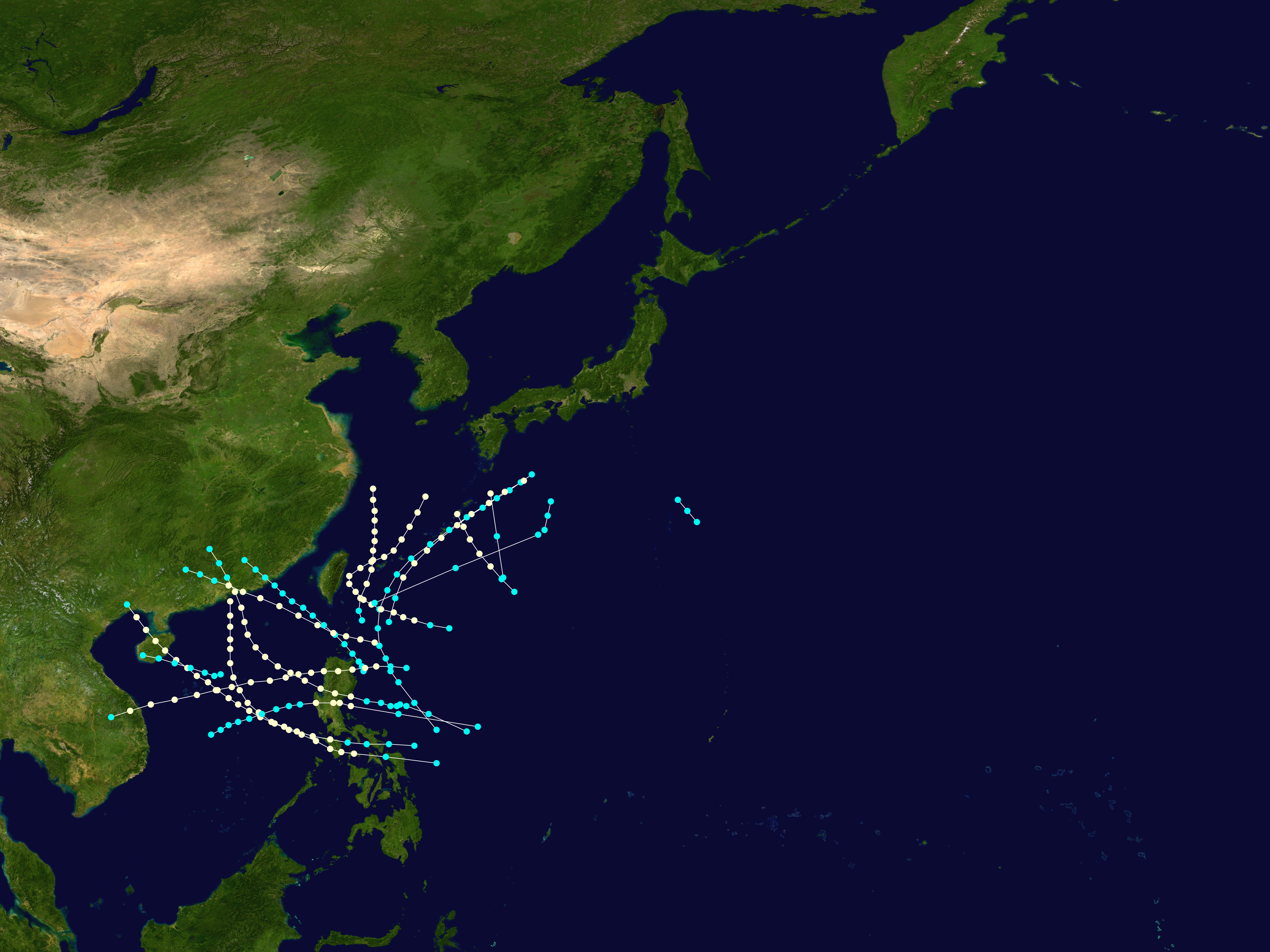
- The season summary for the 1902 Pacific typhoon season, containing all the track maps.

Seasonal boundaries
- First system formed: May 19, 1902
- Last system dissipated: November 11, 1902

Seasonal statistics
- Total depressions: 24
- Total storms: 11
- Total fatalities: ≥623
- Total damage: Unknown

In 1902, there were 24 tropical cyclones across the northwestern Pacific Ocean, north of the equator and west of the International Date Line. There were at least 11 typhoons, which are tropical cyclones with sustained winds of at least 119 kilometres per hour (74 mph). The most effective storm of the year was an unnamed storm that spawned on October 1. The storm caused 600 fatalities and damages to Japan. Another unnamed storm, which formed on July 16, killed 20 people in Hong Kong.

No storms were recorded between January and April. The first storm of the year was a tropical storm that formed on May 19 and dissipated on May 24. Multiple typhoons formed across the Philippine archipelago in the following months. Another powerful storm formed on July 23, which caused damage to a camp and led to three indirect fatalities. The last storm formed on November 7 and dissipated on November 11.

== January–April ==
No activity was recorded within the months of January and April.

== May–August ==
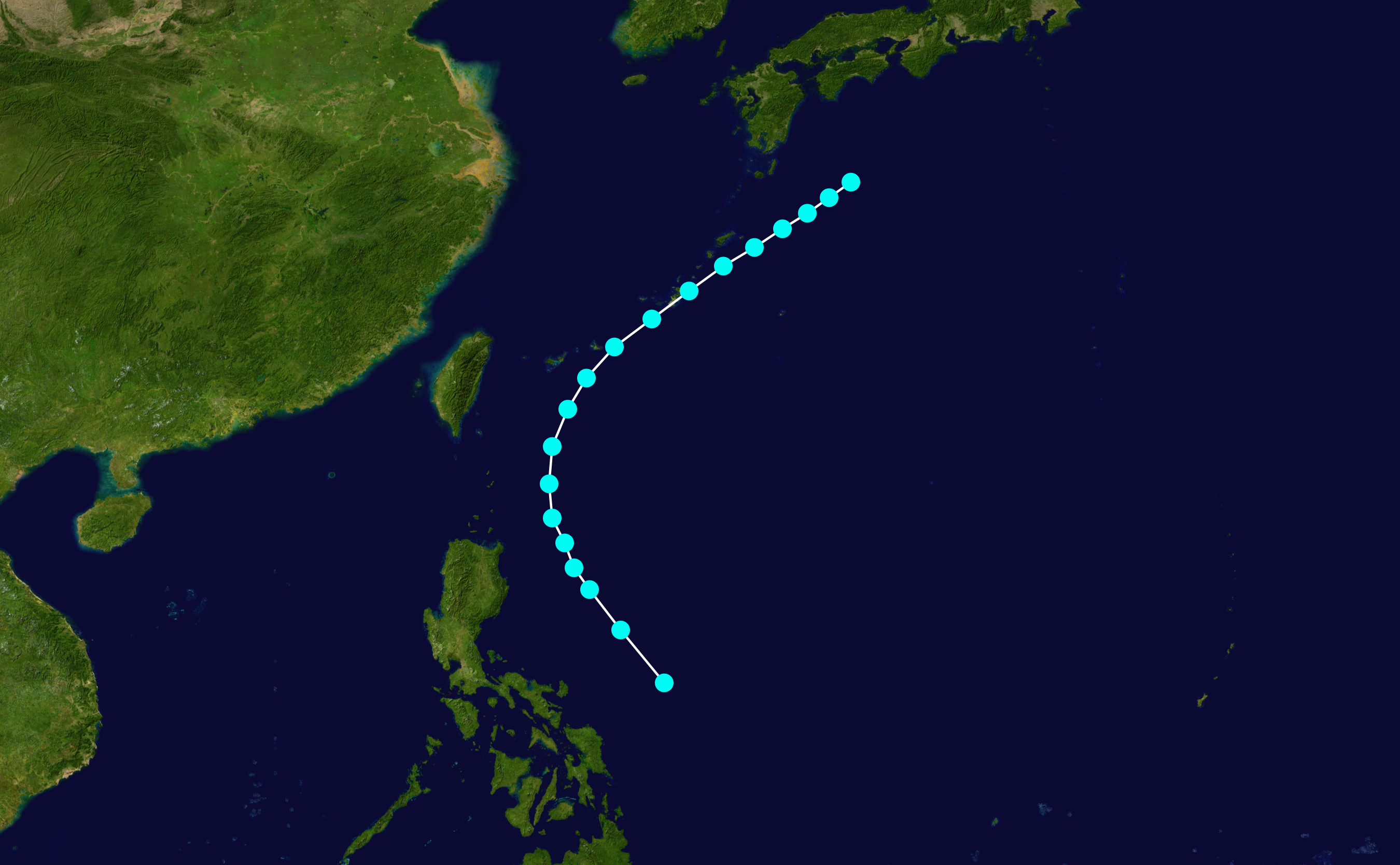
The first typhoon of the 1902 Pacific typhoon season.

On May 19, a tropical storm spawned to the east of Samar Island. The storm moved north, curving along Luzon and Taiwan. Then the storm started moving northeast, dissipating a few days later on May 24, just south of Japan.

On June 1, a storm spawned east of Cagayan, drifting northwest. The storm made landfall over the Spratly Islands the next day. Over the following days, the storm drifted northwest on the South China Sea before making landfall on China on June 5, dissipating soon after. On June 30, a storm spawned. The storm drifted northeast and ended up in the southern portion of Japan. The storm dissipated shortly after, on July 3.

On July 7, a typhoon spawned east of Samar Island. The storm moved west, impacting the northern portion of Samar. The next day, the typhoon made landfall over Masbate. The next day, the storm made landfall over Mindoro and went outside the Philippines. Over the next few days, the storm progressed northeast over the East China Sea. The storm then impacted Hainan and later mainland China, dissipating thereafter on July 13. The same day, a storm spawned east of Northern Samar. The storm drifted east, making landfall on the Philippines. On July 16, the storm turned north and continued over the following days. The storm dissipated on July 18. The storm caused damages to Hong Kong and had a total of 20 fatalities. On July 23, another storm spawned east of Samar Island. The storm moved northwest, making landfall on Luzon. The storm drifted north and dissipated on July 29, after making landfall over China. The typhoon caused damage to a hospital and destroyed Camp Vicars in Mindanao. There were no casualties, but the storm caused three indirect fatalities after an attack just after the typhoon. On July 31, a storm spawned in the South China Sea. The storm traversed northwest, where it made landfall over mainland China. The storm dissipated on August 3.

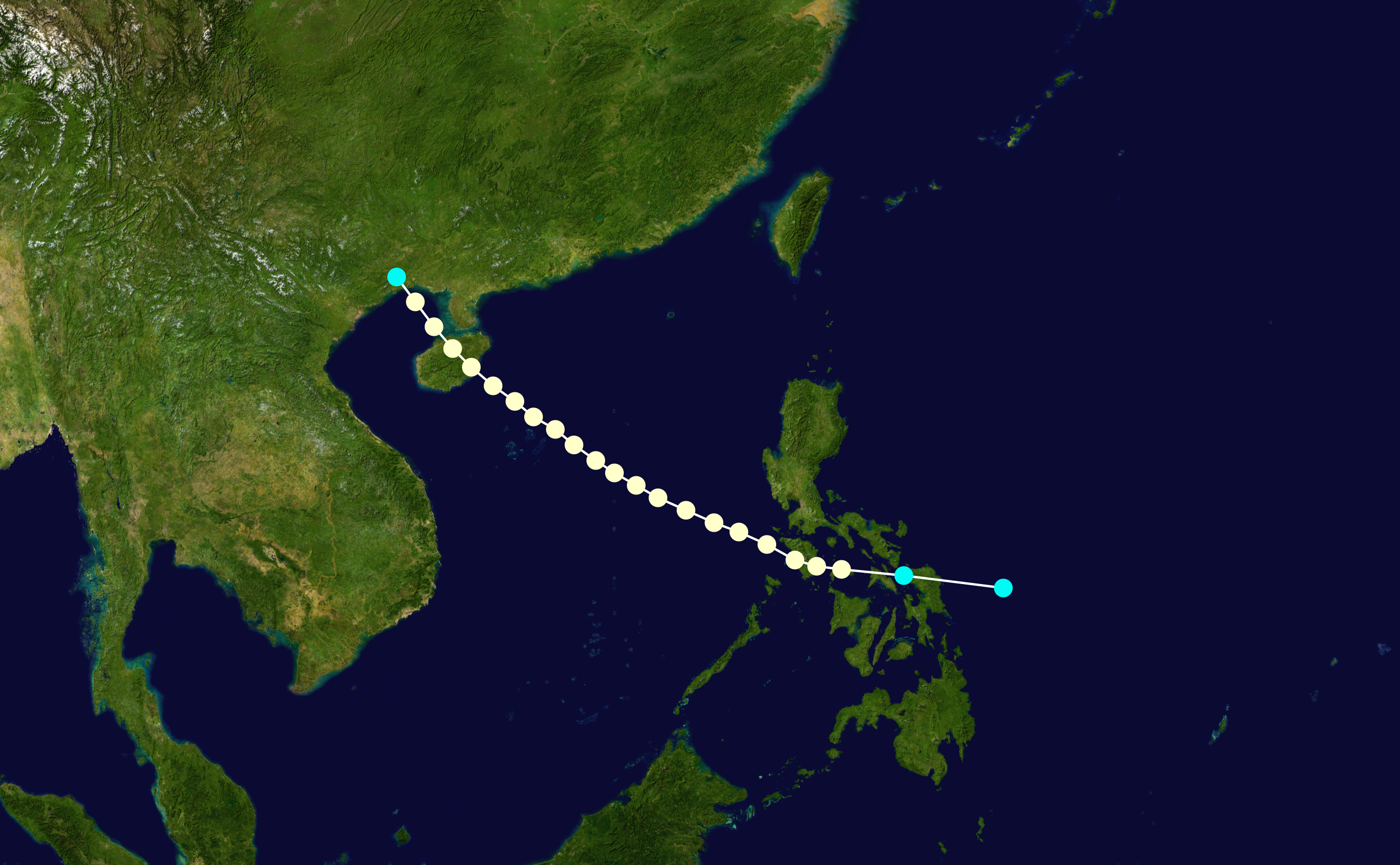
The fourth typhoon of the 1902 Pacific typhoon season, which killed 20 people.

On August 4, a storm spawned east of Taiwan. The storm traversed west over the following days until August 7, where the storm curved west. The storm drifted north over the following days, dissipating on August 9. On August 19, a storm formed east of Hainan. The storm drifted west, where it made landfall on Hainan, and dissipated shortly after on August 21. On August 29, a storm formed east of Taiwan. The storm drifted north, where it dissipated on September 1.

== September–December ==
On September 1, a storm formed south of the Spratly Islands. The storm drifted northwest, where it dissipated on September 3. On September 5, a storm spawned east of Taiwan, then progressed northward. The it dissipated the next day east of the Amami Islands. On September 20, a storm spawned east of Luzon. It traversed east, making landfall on Luzon. The storm dissipated in Vietnam on September 25. On September 26, a typhoon spawned east of Okinawa Island. The storm progressed northwest, then dissipated. It caused high waves over the region, leading to 500 missing-person reports. The same day, a storm spawned south of Taiwan. Over the following hours, the storm progressed northeast, then dissipated the following day. A typhoon killed 1,300 people in Japan.

On October 1, a typhoon hit Japan, causing damage to some parts of Japan. In the Odawara region, eight people were killed, while 50 houses were completely destroyed. The Yumoto-Kodzu-Odawara line was completely damaged. The typhoon killed 600 people in the village of Koyawata, while a similar amount was killed in Kohachimara. The typhoon affected the battleship Shikishima, where the ship was unanchored and dragged ashore. Another ship (the Aoi Maru) towed four other vessels, with the captain and the chief engineer drowning. Another ship, the America Maru, encountered the typhoon, specifically the eye, causing unbearable damage and one death. During the ships' trip to Manila, it encountered the storm, experiencing rough conditions. After turbulence hit the storm, a member fractured their skull and died. The typhoon caused damage to the ship, tearing at the structure. The typhoon affected Yokohama, with shipping disruptions noted. It caused the heaviest waves since 1893, a newspaper reported. On October 5, a storm spawned near the east of Okinawa Island, progressing northward over the following days. It dissipated thereafter.

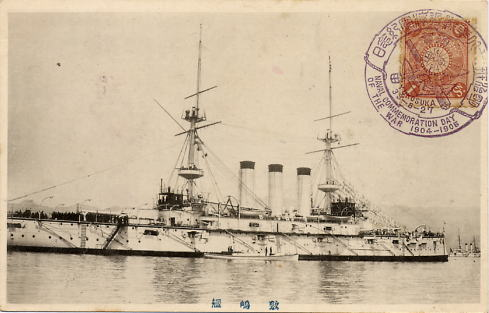
The Japanese battleship Shikishima, which was affected by the 15th typhoon of the season, being dragged ashore.

On November 7, a storm formed east of the Philippines. The storm traversed east before directly making landfall on the Philippines. The storm followed the South China Sea before dissipating on November 11. The same day, it hit a vessel where United States Army General Adna Chaffee was present in. It smashed boats. With it shaking Chaffee's room with strong force.

== See also ==
- 1902 Atlantic hurricane season
- 1900s Pacific hurricane seasons
- 1900s North Indian Ocean cyclone seasons

== Bibliography ==
- Haydn, Joseph; Vincent, Benjamin (1904). Haydyn's Dictionary of Dates and Universal Information: Relating to All Ages and Nations. Ward, Lock.
