= 1900s Pacific hurricane seasons =

The 1900s Pacific hurricane seasons all began on May 15 of their respective years in the Eastern North Pacific Ocean and on June 1 in the Central North Pacific. They all ended on November 30, of each year. These dates conventionally delimit the period when tropical cyclogenesis usually occurs in the Northern Pacific basin, east of the International Date Line. However, Tropical cyclogenesis is possible at any time of the year. Before the dawn of the satellite era in the 1960s, data on Pacific hurricanes is extremely unreliable. For a few years, there are no reported cyclones, although many systems likely formed and went undocumented.

== 1900 ==
A "tropical hurricane" formed south of southwestern mainland Mexico on July 19, and moved generally westward out into the tropical Pacific, last noted well west-southwest of Baja California on July 29.

== 1901 ==
A "tropical hurricane" formed south of southern Mexico on July 19, moving west-northwest through July 27, when it was last seen west of Baja California.

== 1902 ==
I. Forming on July 14, a tropical cyclone made landfall on the southern portion of Baja California on July 22 as it moved northward and dissipated. The remnants produced 1 to 2 inches (25 to 50 mm) of rain over southern California on July 20 and 21. This storm occurred during the strong El Niño of 1901–1902.

II. On August 29, a "tropical hurricane" was noted between mainland Mexico and Hawaii. The cyclone moved north of due west, last seen about 1,000 miles (1,600 km) east-southeast of Hilo on September 1.

III. Between September 18 and 20, a "tropical hurricane" moved just offshore the west coast of Baja California.

IV. A tropical depression formed on October 3. It moved north. After crossing the Isthmus of Tehuantepec, it emerged into the Gulf of Mexico. It eventually became Atlantic Hurricane 4 before making landfall in the Florida Panhandle as a tropical storm.

V. On October 17, a "tropical hurricane" formed just east of the International Dateline, moving westward through the 20th, before looping back towards the east on October 21 and 22.

VI. On December 23, a storm formed 40 miles (60 km) to the southwest of Lanai, Hawaii. Possibly a Kona, or Subtropical storm, it moved northwestward and strengthened. After approaching the International Date Line, it turned to the northeast, and dissipated in the Bering Sea on January 2, 1903. It is unknown if the storm was tropical, but based on its track it had some tropical characteristics. Upon moving through the Hawaiian islands, the storm was disorganized, and caused no reported damage or unusual weather on the islands. The storm is known as the Froc Cyclone, named after Rev. Louis Froc, the Director of the Ziwakei Observatory in Shanghai who discovered the storm.

== 1903 ==
I. A "tropical hurricane" formed near the 170th meridian west longitude on September 7, moving northward past Wake Island into the far north Pacific on September 11.

II. A "tropical hurricane" formed between Mexico and Hawaii on September 24, moving slightly north of due west. The system dissipated about 800 miles (1,300 km) southeast of Hilo on September 29.

== 1904 ==
I. A tropical storm was first observed 250 miles (400 km) southwest of Honolulu, Hawaii, on November 26. It tracked to the northwest, then turned to the northeast. The storm weakened over the cold northern Pacific waters, and dissipated on December 4 to the south of Sitka, Alaska. The storm caused no reported damage. This storm is known as the Zikawei Cyclone, named after the Zikawei Observatory which recorded the storm.

II. On December 23 a tropical storm formed 230 miles (370 km) south-southwest of South Point, Hawaii. It moved to the west-northwest, and after crossing the date line it turned to the northeast, dissipating on the 30th. The storm is known as the Hurd Cyclone.

== 1905 ==
A "tropical hurricane" formed offshore southwestern Mexico on June 29, which made a partial loop on June 30 and July 1 before turning eastward, dissipating south of Mexico on July 3.

== 1906 ==
I. The Gauthier Cyclone formed on 3 May well southeast of the Big Island and moved west-northwestward. It passed to the south of Hawaii, crossed the date line, and turned to the northeast. The storm dissipated in the Bering Sea on 10 May. This extremely rare May central Pacific tropical cyclone occurred during the normally storm-free month of May.

II. A tropical storm formed just off Acapulco circa 11 August and moved north-northwestward through the Gulf of California. It entered southern California on 18 August, dropping 3.49 inches (89 mm) of rain at Needles, California, in 24 hours.

III. A "tropical hurricane" formed offshore southwestern Mexico on 23 September, moving north-northwestward to just offshore the southwest tip of Baja California on 28/29 September before dissipating.

IV. On 2 October, a "tropical hurricane" formed offshore southern Mexico. The system moved initially westward and then northward towards Manzanillo on 4 October. The storm ultimately traveled just west of Baja California and reached Ensenada, Baja California, on 10 October before dissipating without significant effect in California.

V. On 2 October, a tropical storm was first observed 120 miles (190 km) southeast of Hilo, Hawaii. It moved to the northeast and struck the southern tip of Niihau before turning northward. After passing through the islands, it turned to the northeast, and dissipated in the Bering Sea on 9 October. The storm, the Makawao Cyclone, caused 12.7 inches (320 mm) of torrential rainfall in Makawao, Hawaii.

VI. A tropical storm was first observed on 6 November 90 miles (140 km) south of Honolulu, Hawaii. It moved to the north-northwest and passed through the Kauai channel. It turned to the northeast and dissipated on the 13 November to the west of British Columbia. This extremely small, disorganized storm caused no known damage in Hawaii.

== 1907 ==
I. A "tropical hurricane" formed between Mexico and Hawaii on 15 July. The system moved west-northwest, dissipating about 1,500 miles (2,400 km) east of Hilo on 18 July.

II. A "tropical hurricane" formed between Mexico and Hawaii, well southeast of the previous system, on 18 July. This system moved north of due west, dissipating about 1,600 miles (2,600 km) east of Hilo on 22 July.

== 1908 ==
A vortex, possibly a tropical cyclone, was first observed on 17 October to the northwest of Hawaii. It moved quickly northeastward, and dissipated the next day.

== 1909 ==
There are no known tropical cyclones.

== See also ==
- 1900–1940 South Pacific cyclone seasons
- 1900–1950 South-West Indian Ocean cyclone seasons
- 1900s Australian region cyclone seasons
