= 1941 Atlantic hurricane season =

- Season summary map

Seasonal boundaries
- First system formed: September 11, 1941
- Last system dissipated: October 22, 1941

Strongest storm
- By maximum sustained winds: Four
  - Maximum winds: 130 mph (215 km/h) (1-minute sustained)
  - Lowest pressure: 957 mbar (hPa; 28.26 inHg)
- By central pressure: "Texas"
  - Maximum winds: 125 mph (205 km/h) (1-minute sustained)
  - Lowest pressure: 942 mbar (hPa; 27.82 inHg)

Seasonal statistics
- Total depressions: 6
- Total storms: 6
- Hurricanes: 4
- Major hurricanes (Cat. 3+): 3
- Total fatalities: 285
- Total damage: $10 million (1941 USD)

Related articles
- 1941 Pacific hurricane season; 1941 Pacific typhoon season; 1940s North Indian Ocean cyclone seasons

The 1941 Atlantic hurricane season was the period in 1941 in which tropical cyclones formed in the Atlantic Basin. It was a relatively inactive hurricane season, with only six known storms. It officially began on June 16, 1941, and lasted until November 1, 1941. These dates delimit the period of each year when most tropical cyclones tend to form in the Atlantic basin. Of the six cyclones, four attained hurricane status, and three became major hurricanes. The active season had an abnormally late start; the first system formed on September 11, nearly three months after the official beginning date. The last system dissipated five weeks later, on October 22. The season's six storms developed in rapid succession, and on September 23, three hurricanes existed simultaneously in the basin.

In total, the season resulted in about 285 fatalities and over $10 million in damages. The first and last storms of the season were largely insignificant, although the second, fourth, and fifth storms had considerable effects. Two hurricanes struck the United States: Hurricane Two struck East Texas at Category 3 intensity in late September; and Hurricane Five made two landfalls in Florida, the first of which was near Miami at Category 2 intensity, inflicting widespread damage. Additionally, Hurricane Four traversed the Caribbean before striking the Nicaragua–Honduras border at Category 4 intensity, leaving 147 men dead at sea.

The season's activity was reflected with an accumulated cyclone energy (ACE) rating of 52 units, below the 1931–1943 average of 91.2. ACE is a metric used to express the energy used by a tropical cyclone during its lifetime. Therefore, a storm with a longer duration will have high values of ACE. It is only calculated at six-hour increments in which specific tropical and subtropical systems are either at or above sustained wind speeds of 39 mph (63 km/h), which is the threshold for tropical storm intensity. Thus, tropical depressions are not included here.

== Systems ==
=== Tropical Storm One ===
- Tropical storm (SSHWS)
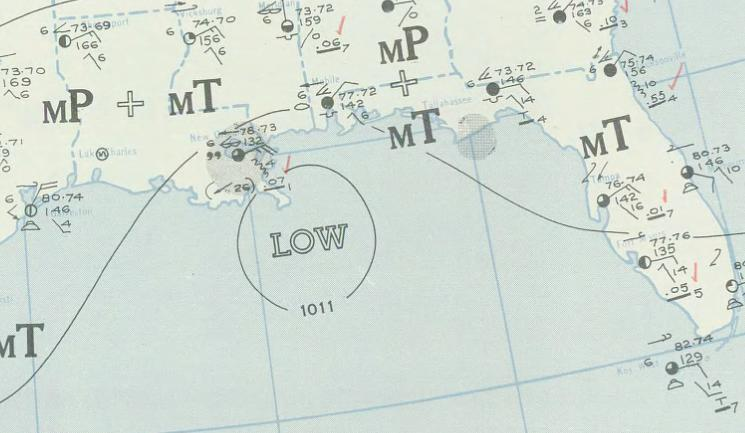
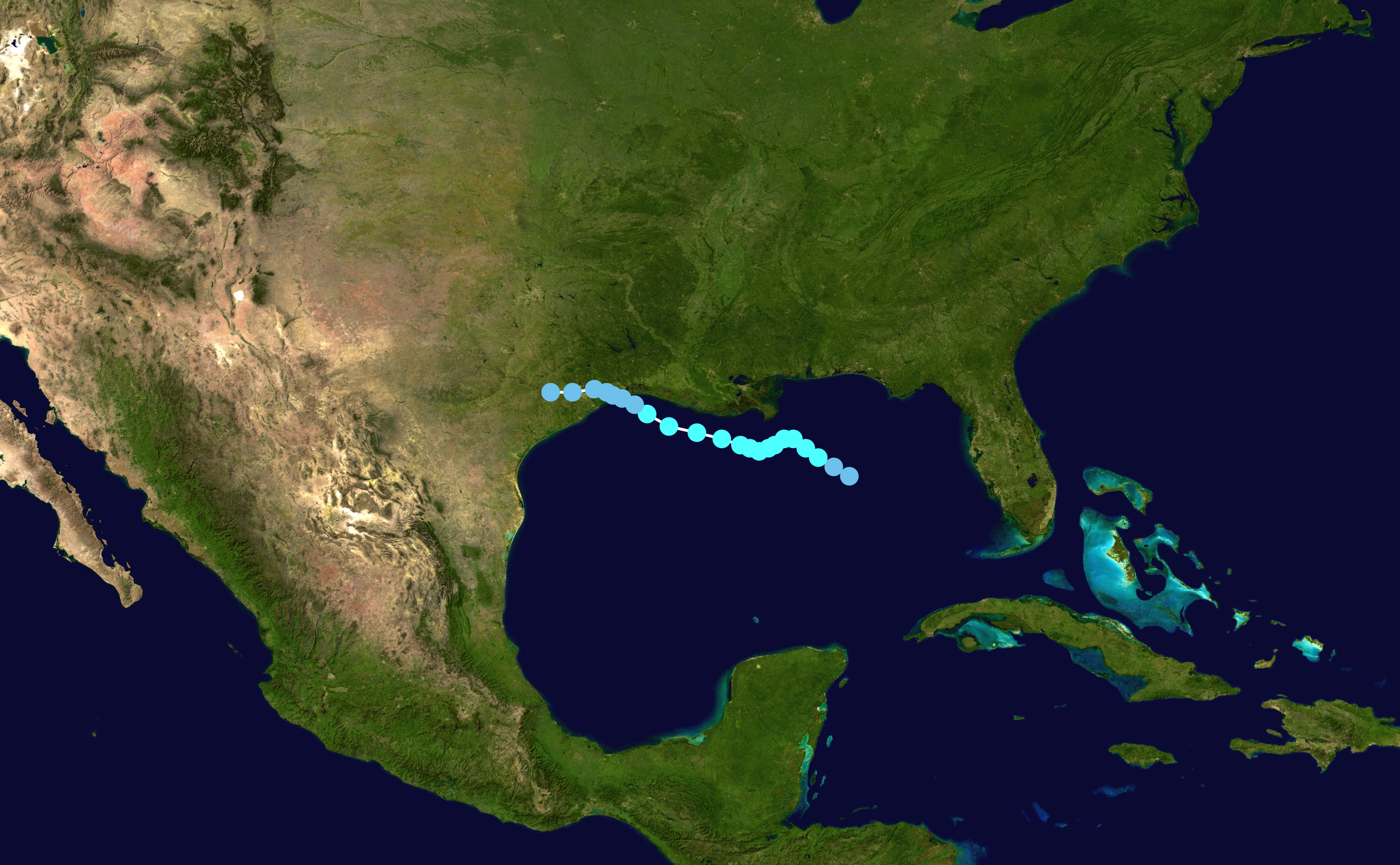
- Duration: September 11 – September 16
- Peak intensity: 60 mph (95 km/h) (1-min); 1001 mbar (hPa)

The first storm of the 1941 season formed on September 11 in the northern Gulf of Mexico. This was an abnormally late start to an Atlantic hurricane season: only on two other occasions between 1887 and 1941 had no storms developed prior to September 11. The storm moved slowly in a generally westward direction for the next few days, peaking as a moderate tropical storm with winds of 45 mph (75 km/h). It then weakened until it made landfall along the northern Texas coast between Galveston and Port Arthur as a tropical depression, where it caused only minor damage. Near 06:00 UTC on September 16, the storm deteriorated into a depression, and dissipated a few hours later. The storm briefly disrupted aerial activities in the Louisiana Maneuvers, but was of limited consequence as it weakened before moving inland.

=== Hurricane Two ===
- Category 3 hurricane (SSHWS)
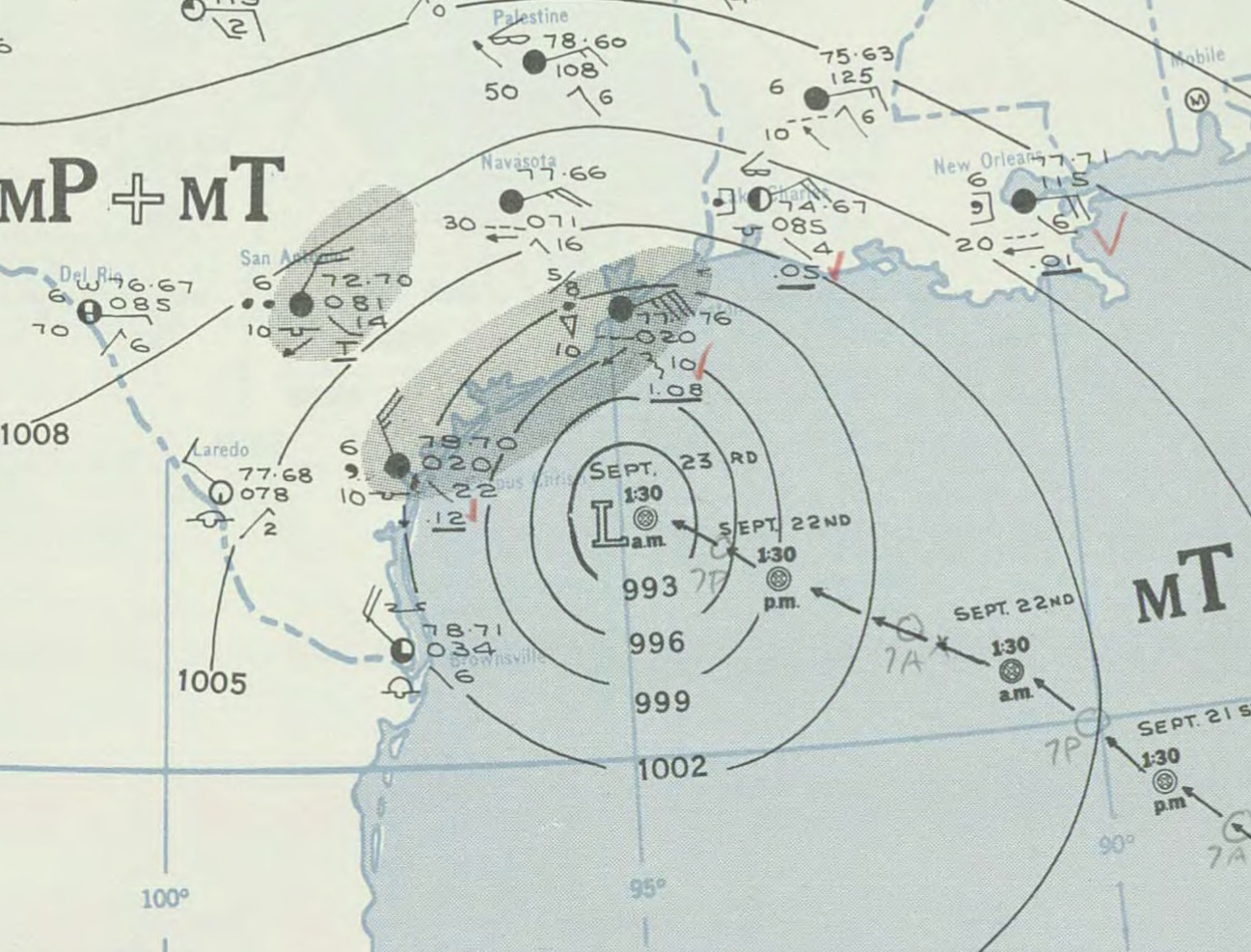
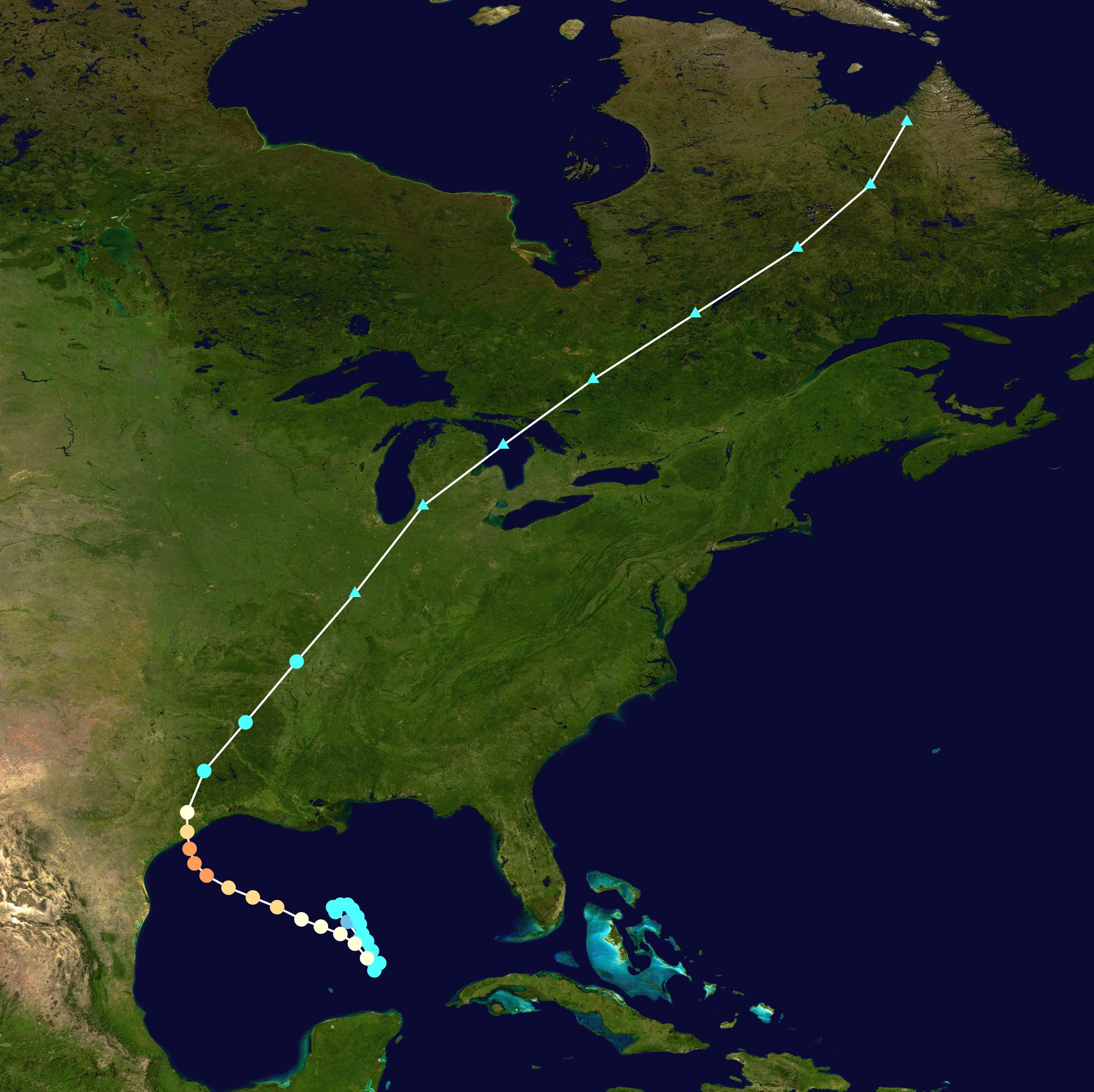
- Duration: September 17 – September 25
- Peak intensity: 125 mph (205 km/h) (1-min); 942 mbar (hPa)

Little more than a day after the first storm of the season dissipated, a tropical depression formed on September 17 in the central Gulf of Mexico about 120 mi (190 km) north of the Yucatán Peninsula. Upon forming, the system began moving generally northward. Early on September 18, the system developed into a tropical storm more than 300 mi (480 km) to the south-southeast of New Orleans, Louisiana. Over the next three days, the intensifying storm executed a gradual clockwise loop, moving to the south-southeast before turning back to the west. After intensifying to a Category 1 hurricane on September 21, the storm began assuming a more northwestward course, toward the Texas Gulf Coast. It continued to strengthen into a major hurricane, peaking at 125 mph (201 km/h) late on September 23. About four hours later, at about 22:00 UTC, the storm went ashore east of Bay City, Texas. The estimated minimum central pressure fell to as low as 942 millibars (27.8 inHg). It curved towards the northeast, passing just east of Houston, and accelerated as it continued to move inland. The cyclone transitioned into an extratropical storm on September 25, and was last recorded at 00:00 UTC on September 27 over northeastern Quebec, near the Torngat Mountains National Park.

Warnings and advisories declared in response to the storm were widely distributed, and approximately 25,000 people in the area evacuated their homes. Officials completed various precautionary measures. Wind gusts along the coast reached up to 100 mph (160 km/h), and high storm tides were recorded. The hurricane inflicted severe damage; destruction to property was worth an estimated $2 million, with an additional $5 million in damage to crops, notably rice and cotton. Overall, the cyclone killed four people. The hurricane affected the southern Louisiana region one week before the Louisiana Maneuvers, a prelude to World War II. Heavy rainfall triggered flooding and swelled rivers, and army vehicles became stuck in the mud as a result. The inclement weather forced hundreds of military aircraft to move inland for shelter.

=== Hurricane Three ===
- Category 1 hurricane (SSHWS)
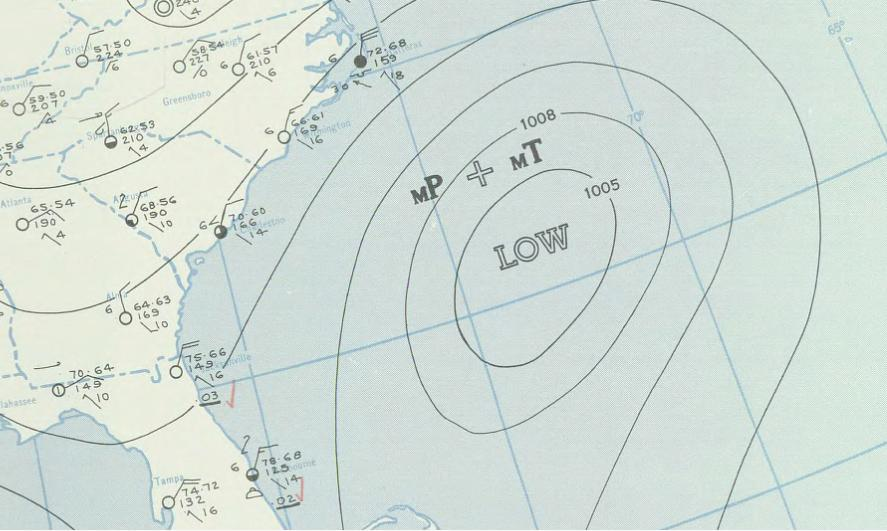
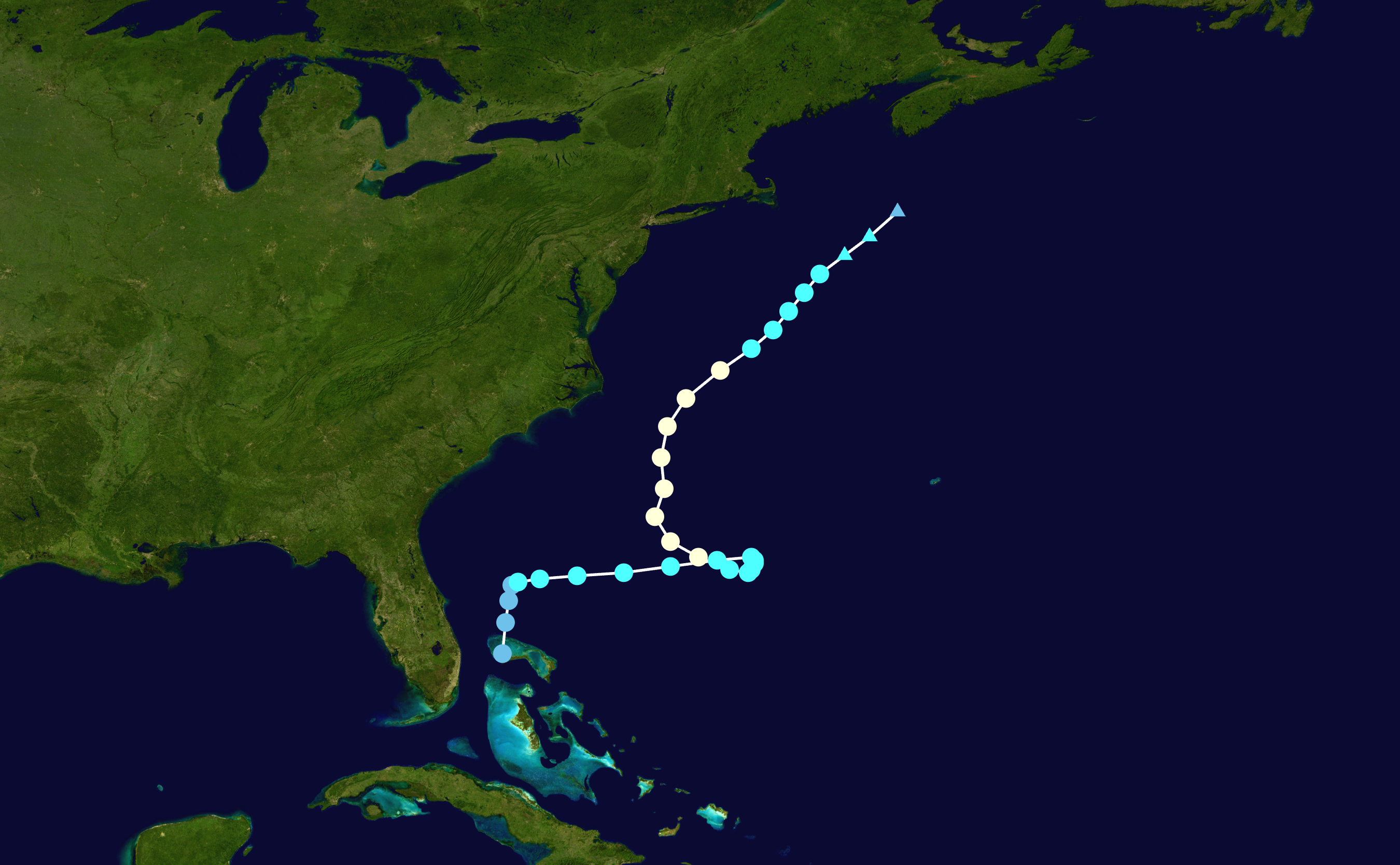
- Duration: September 18 – September 25
- Peak intensity: 80 mph (130 km/h) (1-min); 978 mbar (hPa)

Early on September 18, squally weather was reported throughout the Atlantic coast of Florida, with indications that a circulation center was present 150 mi (240 km) offshore. It is estimated that a tropical storm had formed at around this time. The cyclone began to intensify as it briefly moved northeastward, before abruptly executing an eastward turn. It attained Category 1 hurricane status on September 22, and completed a clockwise loop the next day. It then tracked northwestward toward North Carolina, but began to recurve away from land late on September 22. It weakened into a tropical storm shortly afterward. The system dissipated on September 25 to the south of Nova Scotia. The storm had little or no effect on land, but caused significant delays for North Atlantic shipping. One vessel en route from Curaçao to New York encountered the storm on two separate occasions, recording Force 8 winds on the Beaufort scale both times.

=== Hurricane Four ===
- Category 4 hurricane (SSHWS)
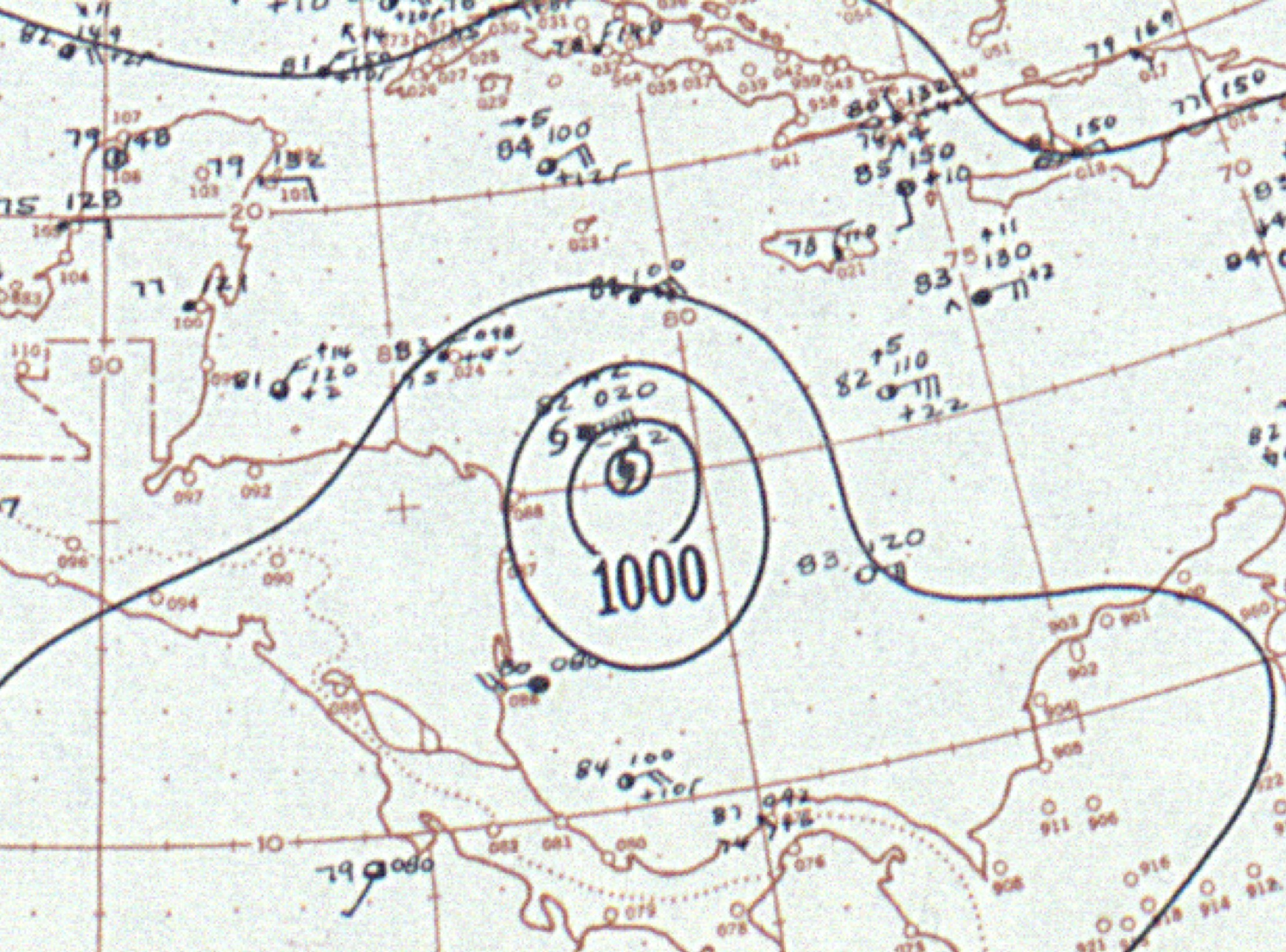
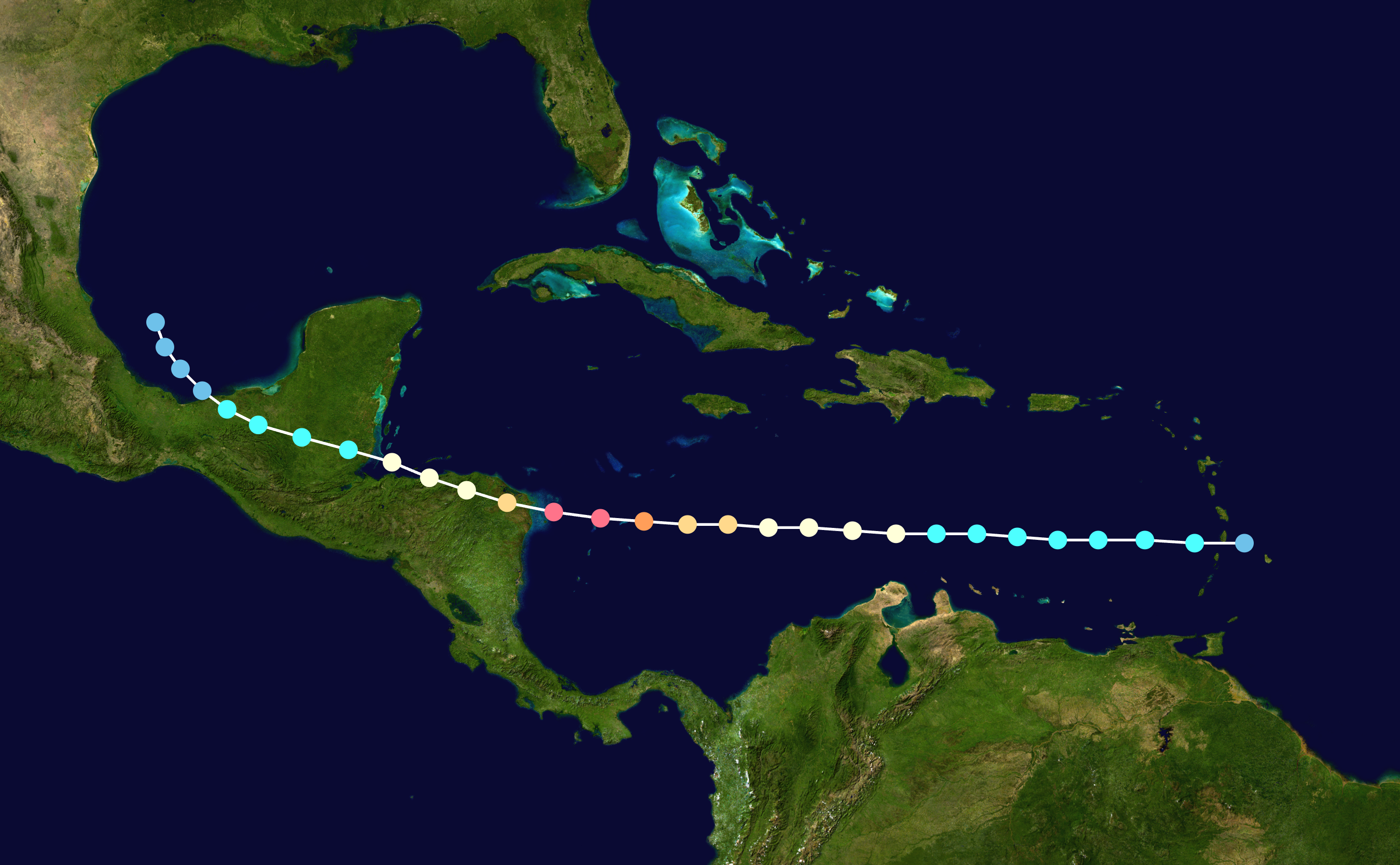
- Duration: September 23 – September 30
- Peak intensity: 130 mph (215 km/h) (1-min); ≤957 mbar (hPa)

On September 23, a minor area of disturbed weather was observed about 75 mi (121 km) to the northwest of Barbados. It is estimated that it developed into a tropical storm shortly thereafter. Tracking westward, it passed just south of St. Lucia and emerged into the Caribbean Sea. By September 25, the storm had reached hurricane strength. Still intensifying, the storm continued generally westward and reached its peak at Category 4 on the Saffir-Simpson Hurricane Scale. By late September 27, the hurricane was situated near Cape Gracias a Dios, Honduras, and accelerated as it moved across the northernmost stretch of the country. It maintained hurricane intensity despite moving over mountainous terrain. After briefly entering the Gulf of Honduras, it moved ashore again in Belize, with winds of up to 85 mph (137 km/h). Gradually weakening, the storm continued inland and weakened to a tropical storm by September 29. The storm emerged over the Bay of Campeche as a tropical depression and dissipated on September 30 while over water.

Approximately 147 people died at sea due to the hurricane, including the loss of the Grand Cayman fishing fleet, 100 crew and four vessels in all. The SS Ethel Sakel displayed a "sinking" message on September 25, about 125 mi (201 km) north of Aruba; she later went down with 20 of her 33 crew members. Two other ships sent out distress signals, one of which capsized, all hands lost. Damage on land was also extensive, and three people drowned at Cape Gracias, which was largely destroyed by the storm; local media reported many more casualties, with up to 125 bodies being found, along with 72 injuries. The final death toll was believed to be even higher. Coastal flooding in Cape Gracias was severe, as seas rose to a height of 22 ft (6.7 m), killing the mayor and his secretary. An anemometer there measured winds of 125 mph (201 km/h). Inland, the storm's eye passed over Boom, sideswiping a ship; barometric pressure aboard the latter fell to 957 mb (28.3 inHg), so the actual pressure at the coast was believed to have been far lower. In Belize, forests sustained major damage. For example, in the Melinda region, high winds brought down about 10% of the large pines.

=== Hurricane Five ===
- Category 3 hurricane (SSHWS)
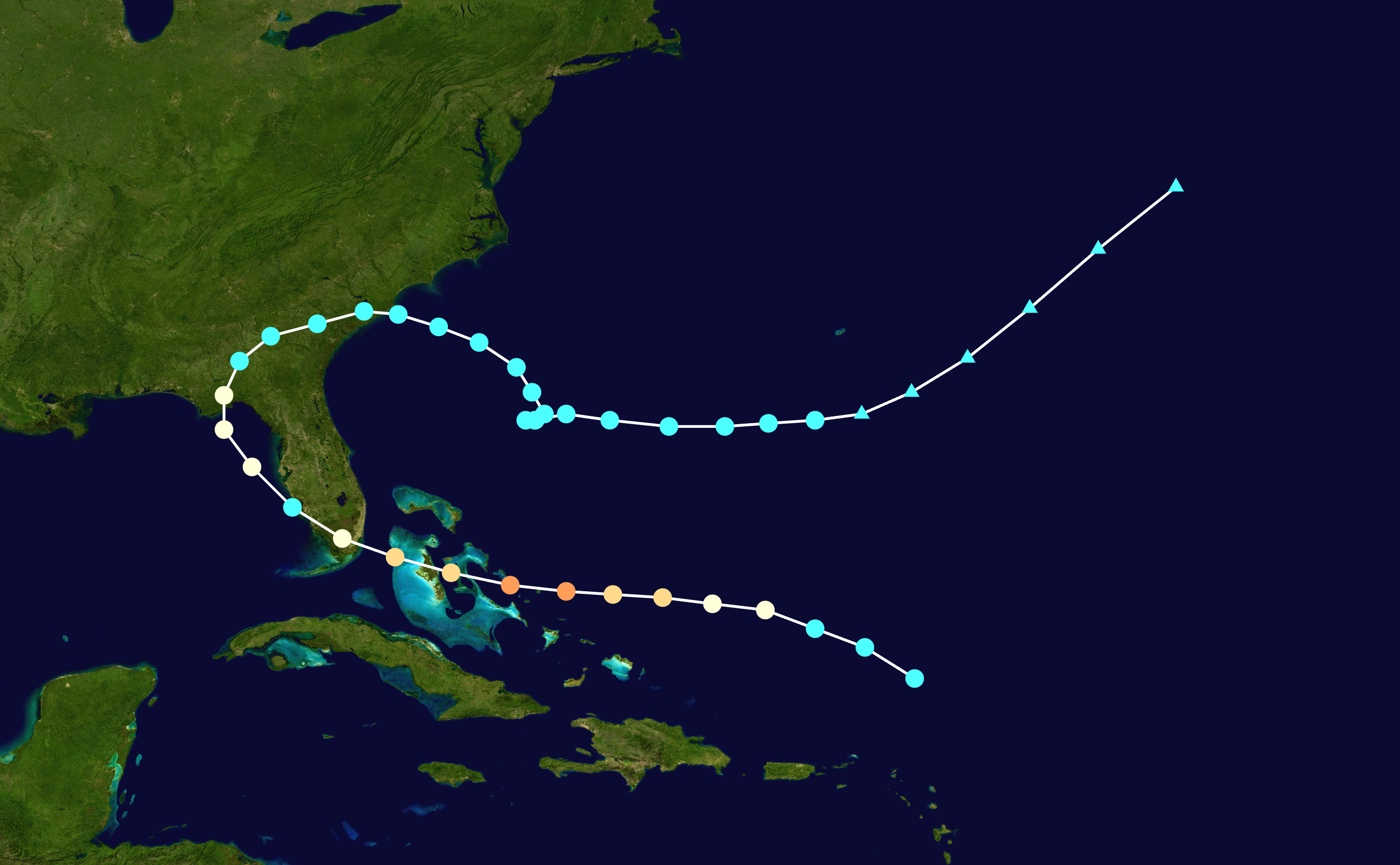
- Duration: October 3 – October 12
- Peak intensity: 120 mph (195 km/h) (1-min); 962 mbar (hPa)

Tropical Storm Five was first observed to the north of the Virgin Islands on October 3. The storm tracked generally westward on October 4, strengthening to its peak intensity of 120 mph (195 km/h) at 12:00 UTC the next day. Now a Category 3 hurricane on the modern-day Saffir-Simpson Hurricane Scale, the storm struck Cat Island, causing major damage. However, the rapidly moving storm soon weakened as its track bent more to the northwest. At 00:00 UTC on October 6, the eye of the storm passed south of Nassau. Ten hours later, the small hurricane struck the north end of Elliott Key, Florida, and then made a second landfall within the hour on the mainland at Goulds, near Homestead. Winds at landfall reached 100 mph (155 km/h), and the calm eye was reported over Goulds. After moving across southern Florida, the storm had weakened to a strong tropical storm, but then restrengthened as it curved northwestward over the Gulf of Mexico. At about 09:00 UTC on October 7, the storm made another landfall along the Florida Panhandle near Carrabelle with winds of 90 mph (140 km/h). Turning toward the north and northeast, it crossed Georgia and South Carolina, and entered the Atlantic Ocean on October 8. The storm fully dissipated several days later.

Preparations for the storm were extensive; residents boarded up homes and businesses, while evacuations were recommended in some coastal areas. In the Bahamas, where winds reached 104 mph (167 km/h), the storm killed three people. The city of Nassau was struck particularly hard, though damage elsewhere in the islands was also severe, with many homes reported destroyed. In Florida, damage was relatively severe, and included the deaths of several people. High winds brought down trees and power lines, and wind-driven salt water damaged vegetation well inland across Dade County, though the storm was characterized by unusually light rainfall. Storm surge in the Everglades region flooded local streets, particularly at Everglades City. As the storm progressed northward, the city of Tallahassee suffered widespread power outages and damage to numerous vehicles. Throughout the state, the hurricane inflicted $675,000 (1941 USD) in damages. The cyclone later killed one person in Georgia.

=== Tropical Storm Six ===
- Tropical storm (SSHWS)
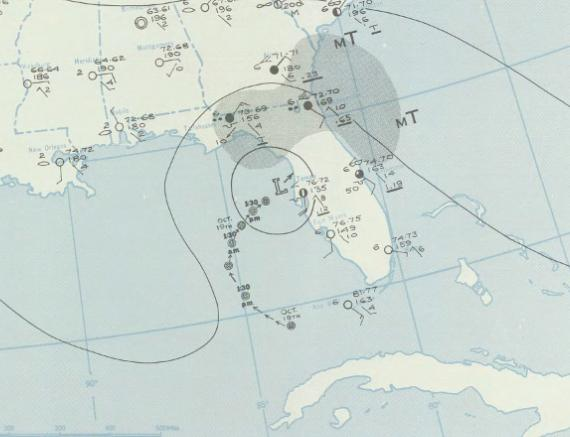
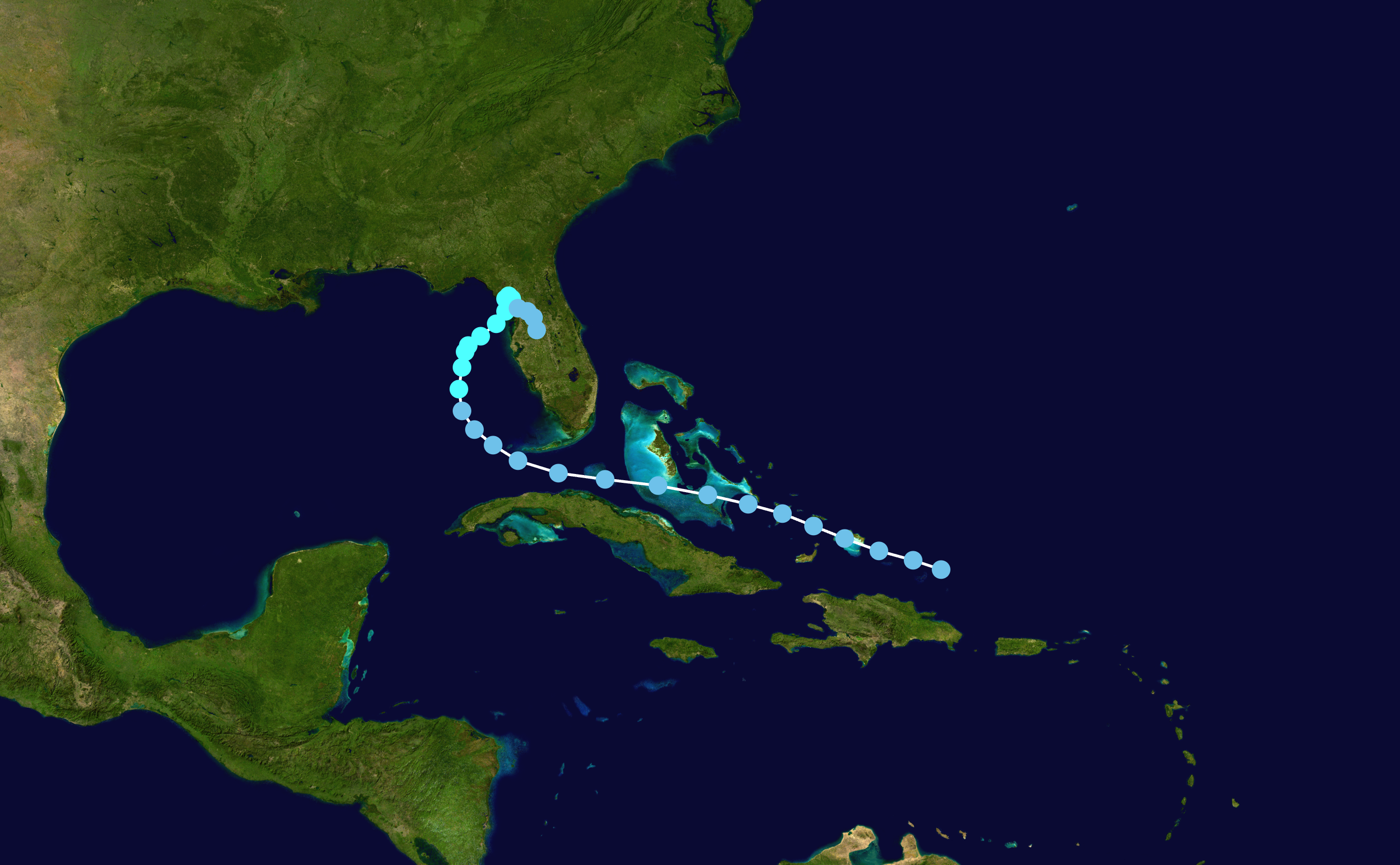
- Duration: October 15 – October 22
- Peak intensity: 50 mph (85 km/h) (1-min); 1002 mbar (hPa)

A tropical storm formed on October 15, and passed through the southern Bahamas. It crossed the Florida Straits, and reached its peak intensity with winds of 50 mph (85 km/h) on October 20, after entering the eastern Gulf of Mexico and turning towards the north. It curved northeastward and made landfall at Cedar Key, Florida. After pushing inland, the storm stalled and weakened to a tropical depression on October 21 before dissipating fully the next day.

The storm's slow forward motion over the state of Florida led to heavy widespread precipitation, locally amounting to 35 in (890 mm) in Trenton, Florida, between October 17 and October 22. Gale-force winds were also reported. Some flood damage occurred throughout the affected locations. An infant was killed following the destruction of a house, possibly related to a tornado spawned by the tropical storm; the baby's parents also sustained injuries.

== See also ==
- 1941 Pacific hurricane season
- 1941 Pacific typhoon season
- 1900–1950 South-West Indian Ocean cyclone seasons
- 1940s Australian region cyclone seasons
- 1940s South Pacific cyclone seasons
