= 1941 Pacific typhoon season =

Seasonal boundaries
- First system formed: February 7, 1941
- Last system dissipated: December 30, 1941

Seasonal statistics
- Total storms: 28
- Total fatalities: Unknown
- Total damage: Unknown

Related articles
- 1941 Atlantic hurricane season; 1941 Pacific hurricane season; 1940s North Indian Ocean cyclone seasons

The 1941 Pacific typhoon season has no official bounds; it ran year-round in 1941, but most tropical cyclones tend to form in the northwestern Pacific Ocean between June and December. These dates conventionally delimit the period of each year when most tropical cyclones form in the northwestern Pacific Ocean. The scope of this article is limited to the Pacific Ocean, north of the equator and west of the International Date Line. Storms that form east of the date line and north of the equator are called hurricanes; see 1941 Pacific hurricane season. There were 28 tropical cyclones in the western Pacific in 1941.

== Storms ==
=== Tropical Storm Two ===
- Tropical storm (SSHWS)
- Duration: June 3 – June 5
- Peak intensity: 65 km/h (40 mph) (1-min);

The system developed east of Taiwan. It moved in a northeastward direction and it finally dissipated on the 5th. It is unknown whether the storm's peak strength was at a strong tropical depression or weak tropical storm. The storm affected the Ryukyu Islands.

=== Tropical Storm Twenty-five ===
- Tropical storm (SSHWS)
- Duration: October 20 – October 22
- Peak intensity: 100 km/h (65 mph) (1-min);

The storm developed north of Palawan, Philippines on October 20. It moved westwards in the South China Sea and it dissipated two days later.

== See also ==
- List of Pacific typhoon seasons
- 1900–1950 South-West Indian Ocean cyclone seasons
- 1940s Australian region cyclone seasons
- 1940s South Pacific cyclone seasons
