= 1941 Pacific hurricane season =

Seasonal boundaries
- First system formed: July 3, 1941
- Last system dissipated: November 3, 1941

Strongest storm
- Name: Six and Seven
  - Lowest pressure: 937 mbar (hPa; 27.67 inHg)

Seasonal statistics
- Total storms: 9
- Hurricanes: 2
- Total fatalities: 15
- Total damage: Unknown

Related articles
- 1941 Atlantic hurricane season; 1941 Pacific typhoon season; 1940s North Indian Ocean cyclone seasons

The 1941 Pacific hurricane season ran through the summer and fall of 1941. Before the satellite age started in the 1960s, data on east Pacific hurricanes was extremely unreliable. Most east Pacific storms were of no threat to land. 1941 season was the last season before Monthly Weather Review stopped publishing temporarily due to World War II.

== Systems ==
=== Tropical Storm One ===
On July 3, a tropical cyclone was spotted, and a pressure of 99.55 kPa (29.40 inHg) was reported. It possibly headed northeast, towards Cape Corrientes, as a tropical cyclone was spotted in that direction on July 6. However, it is possible that these observations were actually of two different tropical cyclones.

=== Tropical Cyclone Two ===
A tropical cyclone was spotted on July 15, south of Mexico. The next day, another cyclone was spotted further to the west. On July 18, weather possibly associated with a tropical cyclone was reported south of Cabo San Lucas. It is unknown whether either one of these two latter observations are of the same system as reported on July 15.

=== Possible Tropical Cyclone Three ===
On July 21, a possible tropical cyclone was detected.

=== Tropical Cyclone Four ===
On August 16, a tropical cyclone formed well off the coast of Mexico. It tracked generally northwest, and dissipated in the central Pacific north-northeast of the Hawaiian Islands on August 24. The lowest pressure reported by a ship was 29.34 inHg (99.4 kPa).

=== Hurricane Five ===
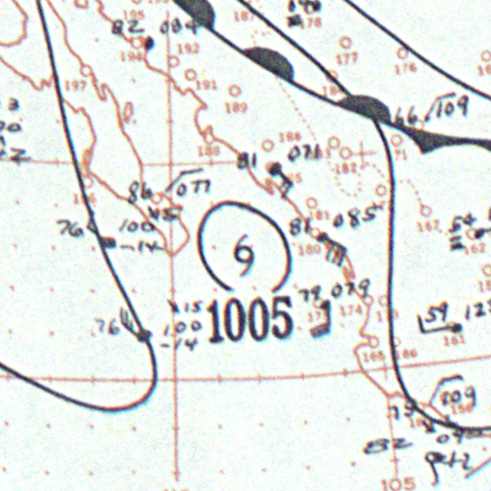
Surface weather analysis of the hurricane on September 10

A tropical storm was first reported on September 8. The storm quickly intensified, becoming a mid-level tropical storm the next day. Subsequently, the storm attained its lowest reported pressure of 1,001.4 mbar (29.57 inHg). It slowly moved northwestward, and entered the Gulf of California. After slamming into the southern portion of Baja California Sur, when winds were measured at 85 mph (135 km/h). The hurricane was last observed on September 12.

Strong winds and heavy rain lashed the southern tip of the Baja California Peninsula for 48 hours, lasting until late September 12. The wind destroyed poorer sections of La Paz and nearby villages. Two villages, Santiago and Triunfo, were completely destroyed. The torrential rains damaged many highways across the peninsula and left thousands homeless. The tuna canning industry declined rapidly in San José del Cabo.

The port town of Cabo San Lucas was washed away and mostly destroyed due to flooding Furthermore, "great loss of life" was reported. Initially following the system, activity among surrounding areas of the village ceased. As of 1966, this tropical cyclone is regarded as one of the worst storms to affect the city. Meanwhile, one of the town's suburbs was forced to relocate 1 mi (1.6 km) inland.

Throughout the peninsula, 15 people were killed, and many were injured. According to press reports from Mexico City, the hurricane was considered the worst system to affect the state since the dawn of the 20th century. Moisture from this hurricane passed into the southwestern United States, where it caused rain of up to 1 in (25 mm) in the mountains and deserts of California. From September 16 to 22, cloudiness and showers were reported along the southern portion of the state.

=== Hurricane Six and Seven ===
A storm was first spotted September 17, and another was reported nearby the next day. These two systems then merged. The combined tropical cyclone subsequently became a very intense hurricane on September 19. That day, a ship passing through the eye reported a rapidly falling pressure that bottomed out at 27.67 inHg (93.7 kPa). At that time, the low was the strongest hurricane in the basin since 1939 and second strongest ever recorded. The hurricane then weakened, and entered the Gulf of California on September 20, at which point it was lost track of by meteorologists.

=== Tropical Disturbance Eight ===
Later in the month, from September 21 to September 24, a tropical disturbance was noted south of the Mexican coast, but failed to develop further.

=== Tropical Storm Nine ===
A tropical storm was reported on November 2 and 4. A ship reported a pressure of 100.07 kPa (29.55 inHg).

=== Tropical Storm Ten ===
Another tropical storm was detected on November 3. It was reportedly very small. A ship reported a pressure of 100.44 kPa (29.66 inHg). This cyclone was unusually close to the equator, at latitude 7°30′.

== See also ==
- 1941 Atlantic hurricane season
- 1941 Pacific typhoon season
- 1940s North Indian Ocean cyclone seasons
- 1900–1950 South-West Indian Ocean cyclone seasons
- 1940s Australian region cyclone seasons
