= 1946 Pacific typhoon season =

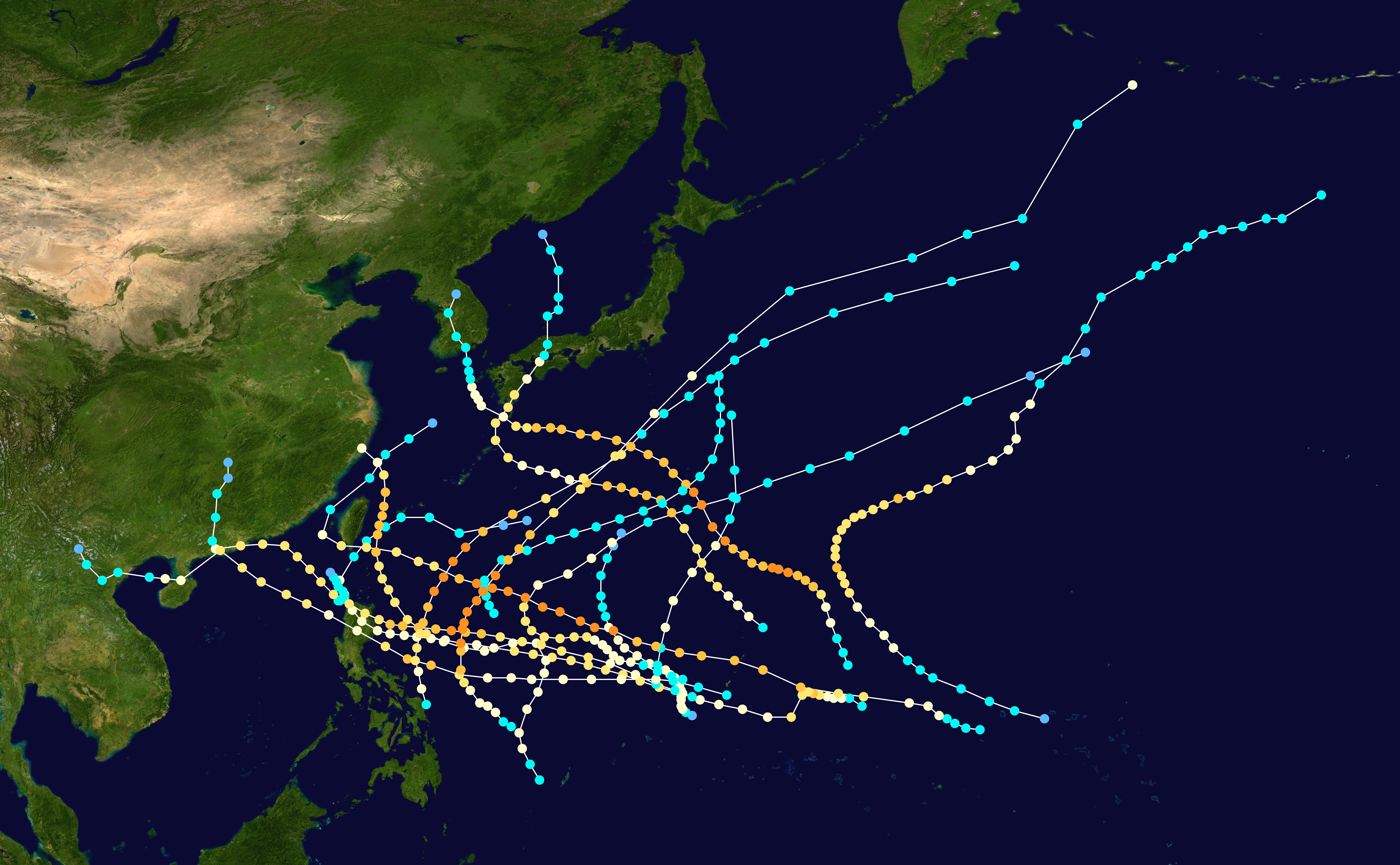
- Season summary map

Seasonal boundaries
- First system formed: March 27, 1946
- Last system dissipated: November 20, 1946

Strongest storm
- Name: Lilly
  - Maximum winds: 220 km/h (140 mph) (1-minute sustained)
  - Lowest pressure: 927 hPa (mbar)

Seasonal statistics
- Total storms: 19
- Typhoons: 18
- Very strong typhoons: 0 (unofficial)
- Total fatalities: Unknown
- Total damage: Unknown

Related articles
- 1946 Atlantic hurricane season; 1942–1948 Pacific hurricane seasons; 1940s North Indian Ocean cyclone seasons

The 1946 Pacific typhoon season has no official bounds; it ran year-round in 1946, but most tropical cyclones tend to form in the northwestern Pacific Ocean between June and December. These dates conventionally delimit the period of each year when most tropical cyclones form in the northwestern Pacific Ocean.

The scope of this article is limited to the Pacific Ocean, north of the equator and west of the International Date Line. Storms that form east of the date line and north of the equator are called hurricanes; see 1946 Pacific hurricane season. At the time, tropical storms that formed within this region of the western Pacific were identified and named by the United States Armed Services, and these names are taken from the list that USAS publicly adopted before the 1945 season started.

== Storms ==
=== Typhoon Barbara ===
- Typhoon (JMA)
- Category 3 typhoon (SSHWS)
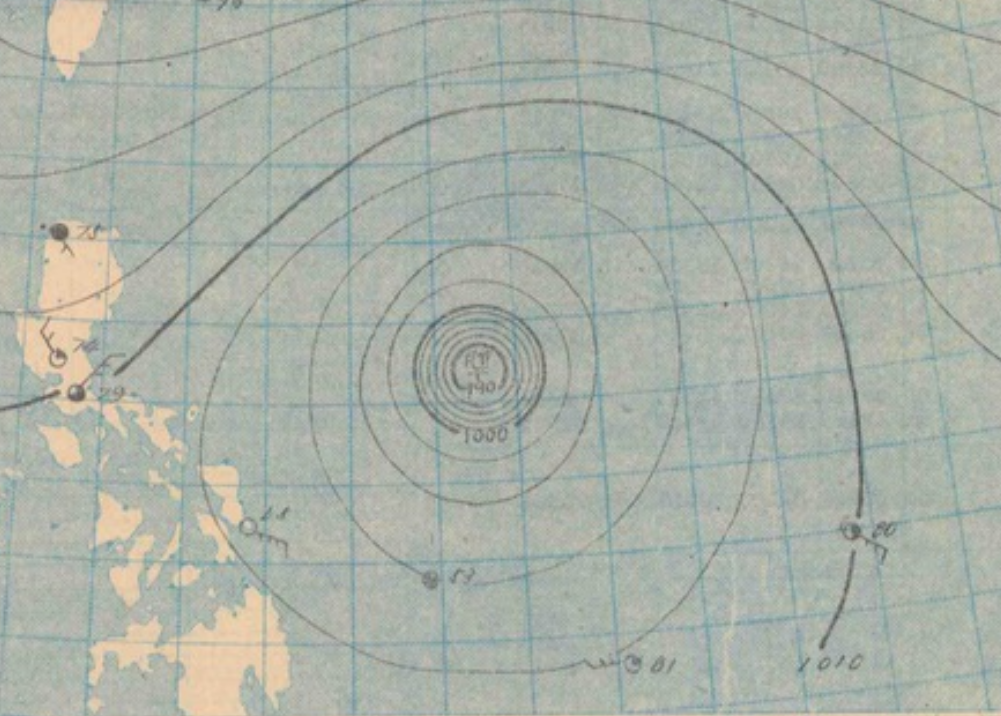
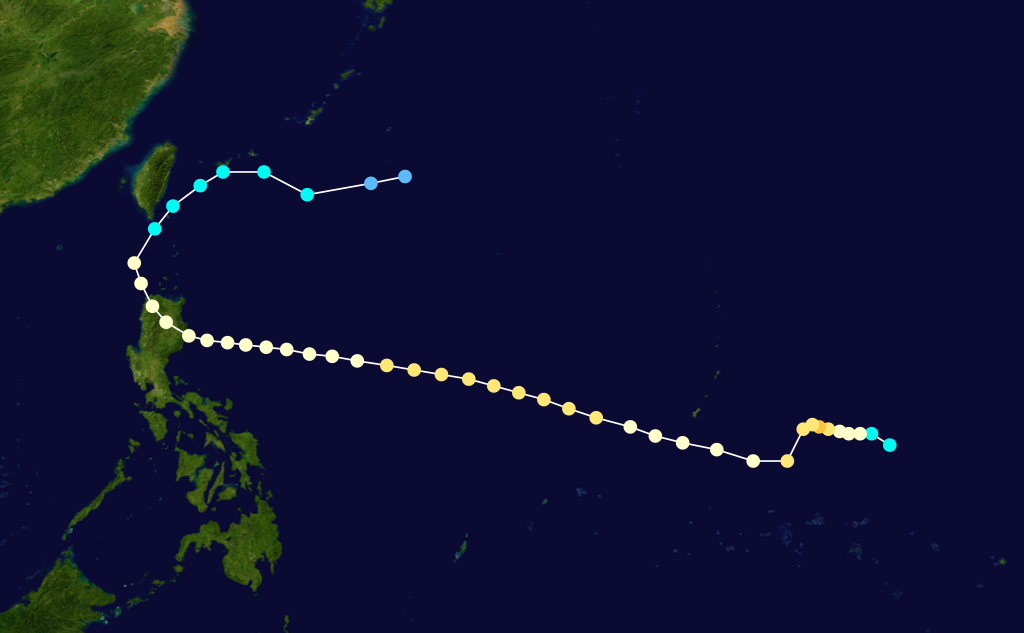
- Duration: March 27 – April 7
- Peak intensity: 185 km/h (115 mph) (1-min); 965 hPa (mbar)

Typhoon Barbara formed on March 27, and moved west. It strengthened briefly to a Category 3-equivalent typhoon with 115 mph winds. But shortly after, it began to weaken. Typhoon Barbara curved northward and then westward, in turn hitting the Philippines as a category 1. After making landfall, it curved back to the east and continued to weaken until April 7, when it dissipated.

=== Typhoon Charlotte ===
- Typhoon (JMA)
- Category 1 typhoon (SSHWS)
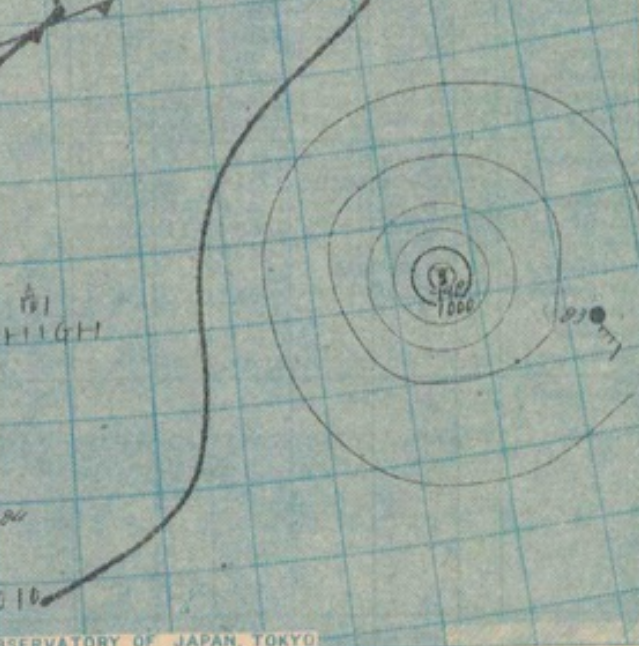
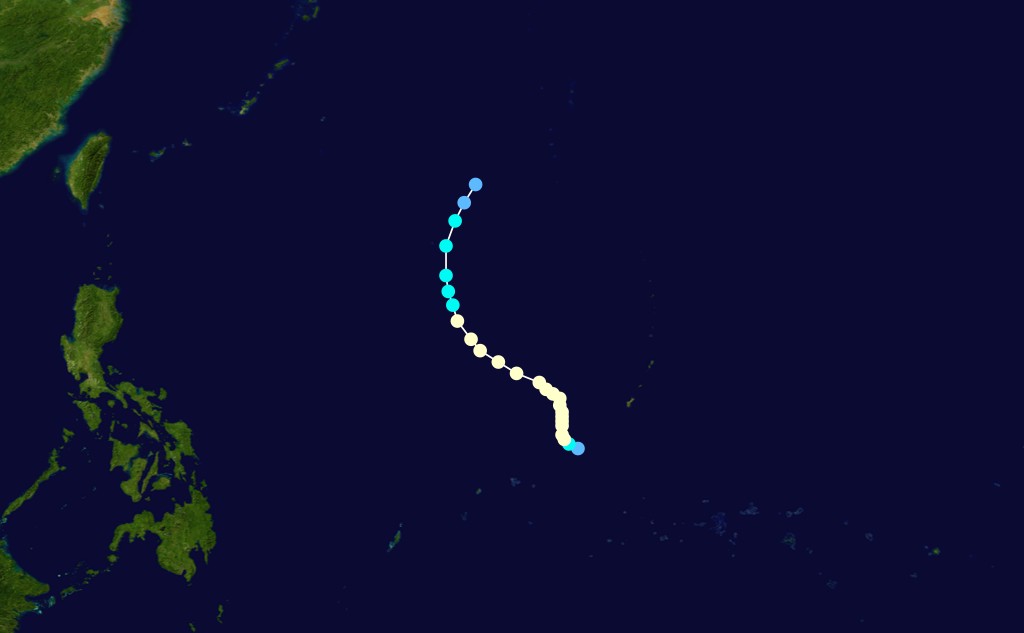
- Duration: May 11 – May 17
- Peak intensity: 150 km/h (90 mph) (1-min); 973 hPa (mbar)

Charlotte formed in the open Pacific on May 11. It then dissipated on May 17.

=== Typhoon Dolly ===
- Typhoon (JMA)
- Category 3 typhoon (SSHWS)
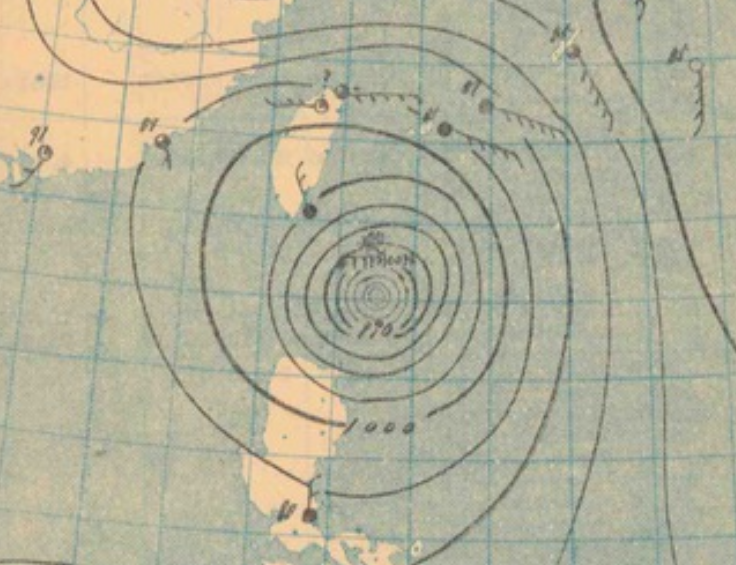
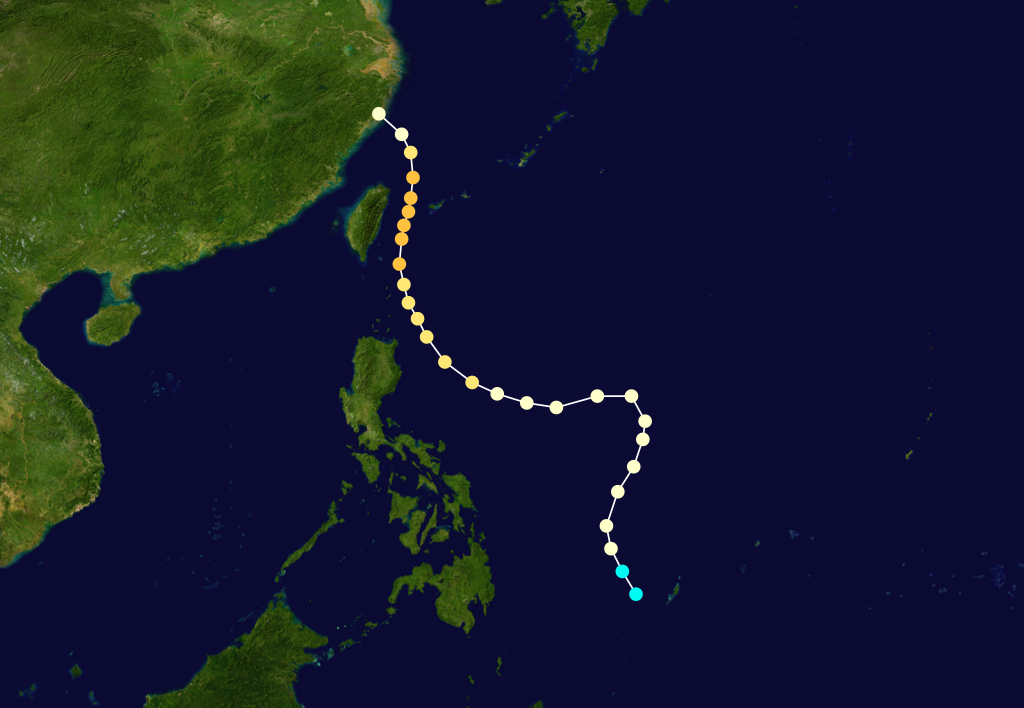
- Duration: June 17 – June 23
- Peak intensity: 205 km/h (125 mph) (1-min); 942 hPa (mbar)

On June 17, Typhoon Dolly formed. It moved northwestward, only to strengthen. After passing by the Philippines, it reached its maximum intensity of 125 mph, equivalent to a strong Category 3 hurricane. It rounded around Taiwan and made landfall on China's shoreline. It dissipated hours after on June 23.

=== Tropical Storm Elinor ===
- Tropical storm (SSHWS)
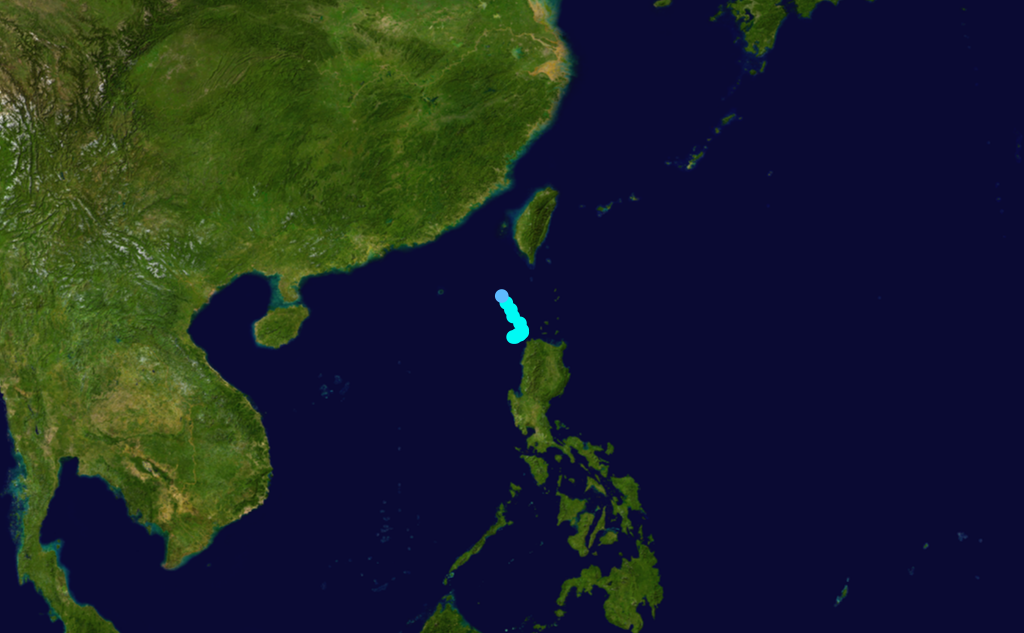
- Duration: June 23 – June 25
- Peak intensity: 95 km/h (60 mph) (1-min); 986 hPa (mbar)

Elinor formed near Northern Luzon on June 23. However, due to the interaction with nearby Dolly, it didn't strengthened further and it dissipated on June 25.

=== Typhoon Ginny ===
- Typhoon (JMA)
- Category 1 typhoon (SSHWS)
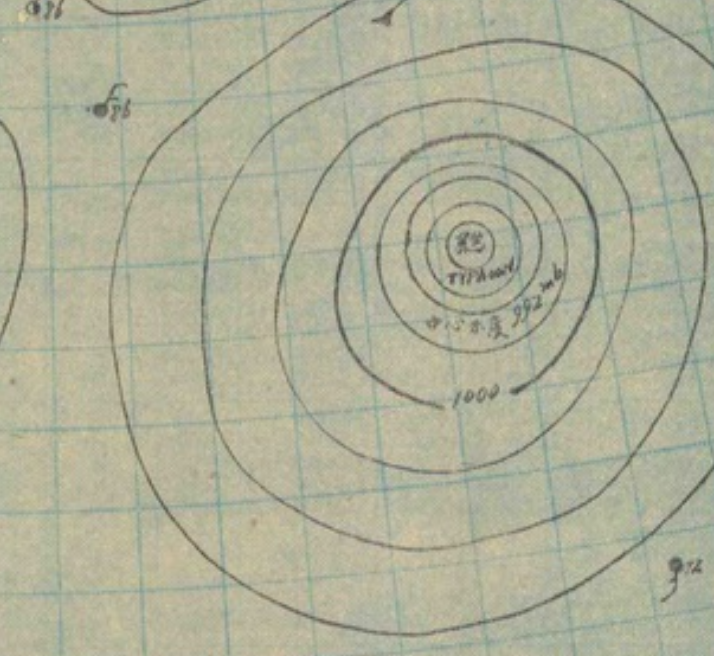
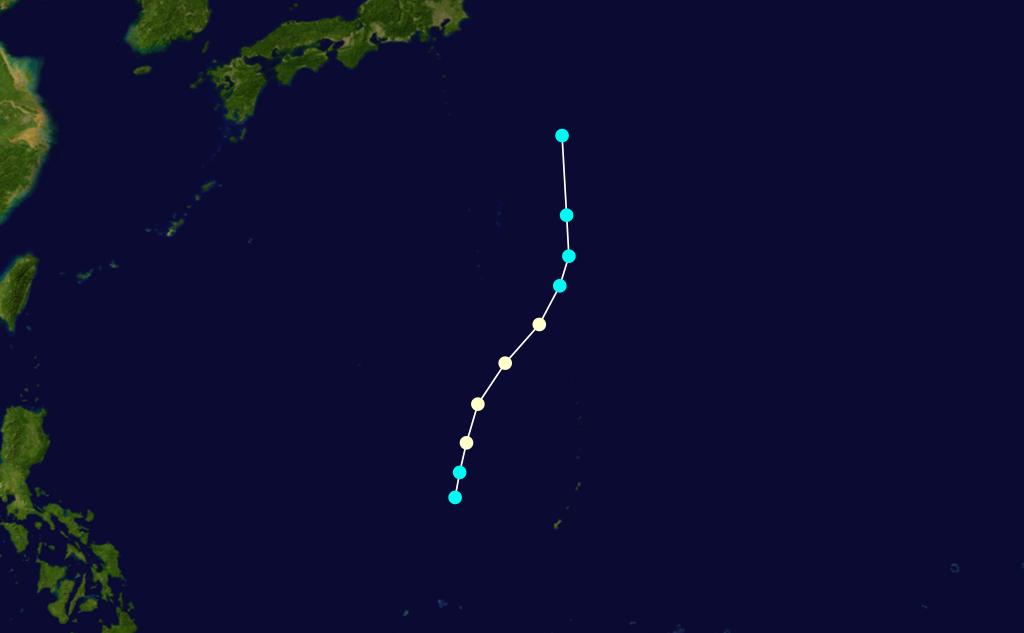
- Duration: June 30 – July 2
- Peak intensity: 150 km/h (90 mph) (1-min); 971 hPa (mbar)

Ginny formed on June 30 in the open western Pacific. It then moved to the north, weakening and dissipated on July 2. No landmasses were affected.

=== Early-July Typhoon ===
- Typhoon (JMA)
- Category 1 typhoon (SSHWS)
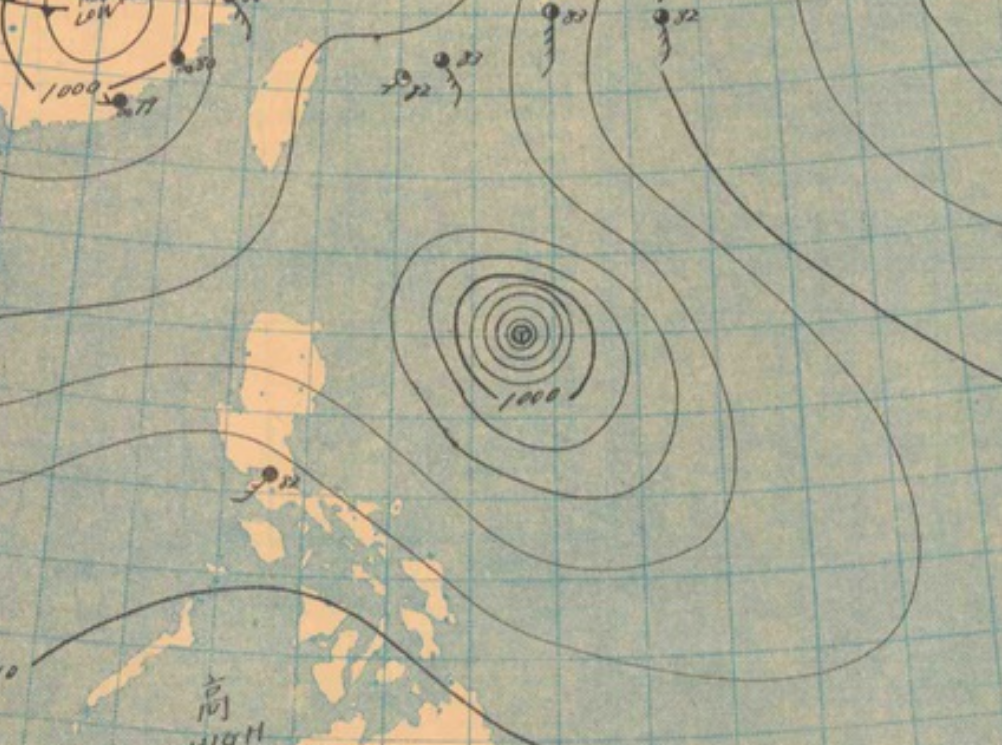
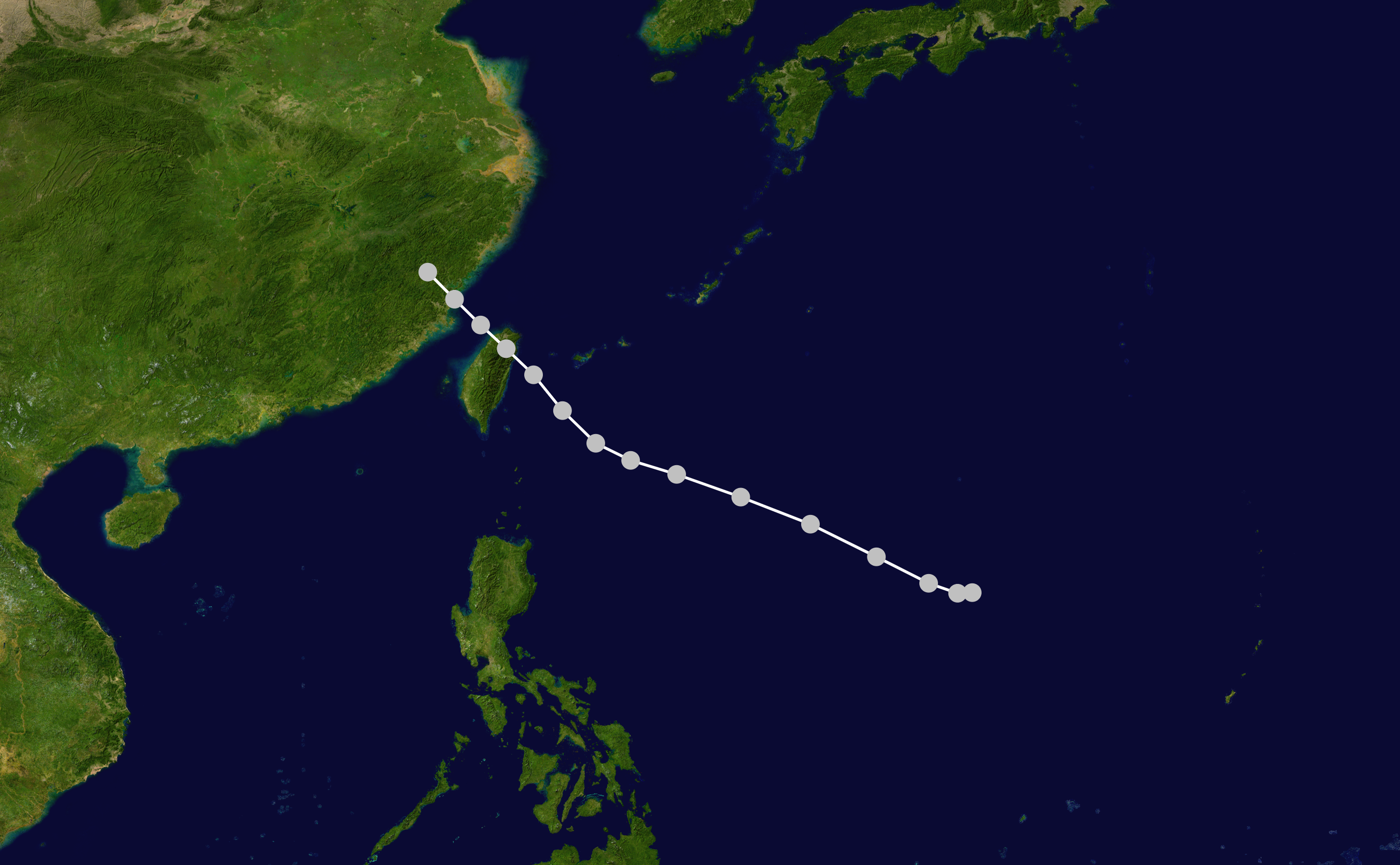
- Duration: July 8 – July 12
- Peak intensity: 120 km/h (75 mph) (1-min); 980 hPa (mbar)

A tropical storm was first noted in weather maps on July 8, near Palau. Moving to the northwest, it strengthened to a minimal typhoon before it hit Formosa as a weakening storm. It then crossed the Formosa Strait, before making another landfall near Xiamen on July 12. It was last noted on the same day.

The damages and deaths, if any, were unknown.

=== Typhoon Ingrid ===
- Typhoon (JMA)
- Category 4 typhoon (SSHWS)
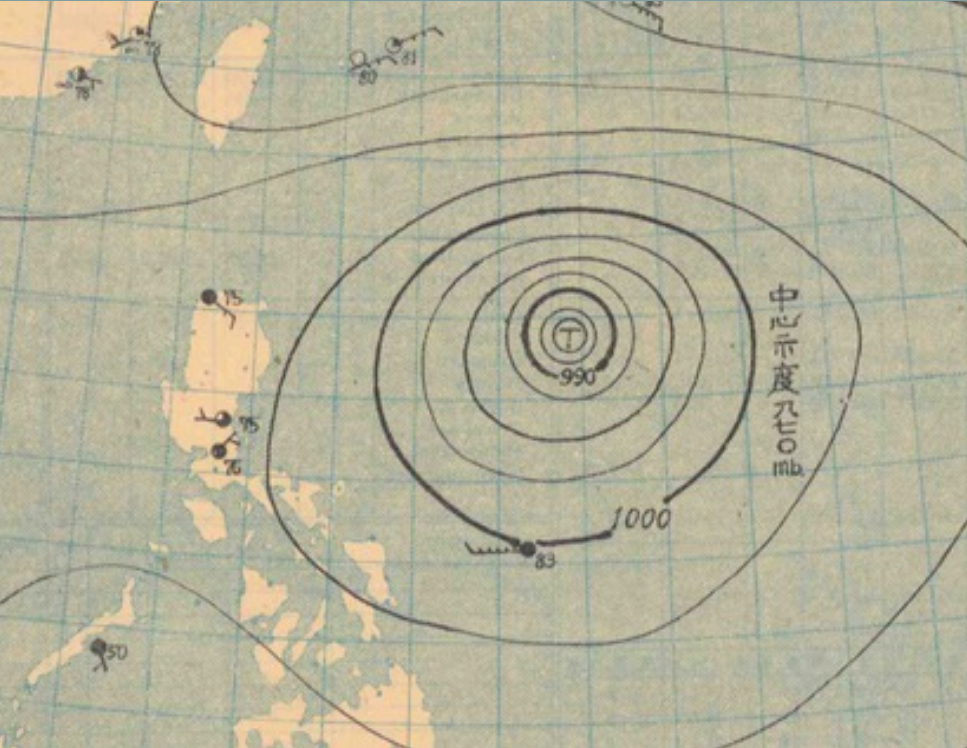
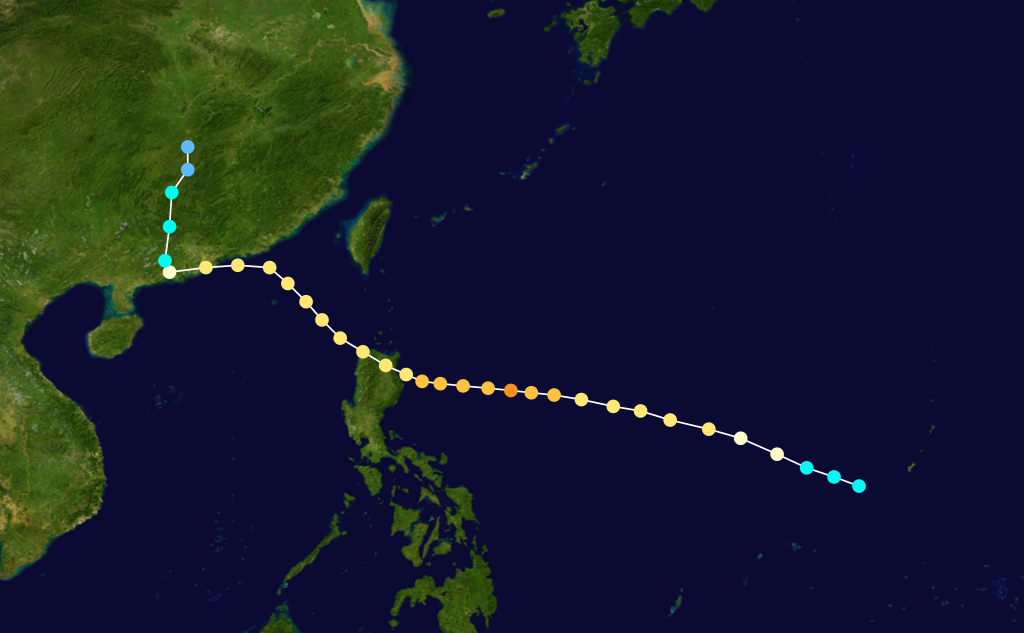
- Duration: July 12 – July 20
- Peak intensity: 220 km/h (140 mph) (1-min); 944 hPa (mbar)

Tropical Storm Ingrid formed July 12, immediately moving west. After strengthening, it briefly became the equivalent to a Category 4 hurricane on July 15. It weakened to a Category 2-equivalent typhoon and struck the northern part of the Philippines. Ingrid retained its strength until it hit Hong Kong and Macau. Right after it made landfall immediately to the west of Macau, it moved north and dissipated on July 20.

=== Typhoon Janie ===
- Typhoon (JMA)
- Category 3 typhoon (SSHWS)
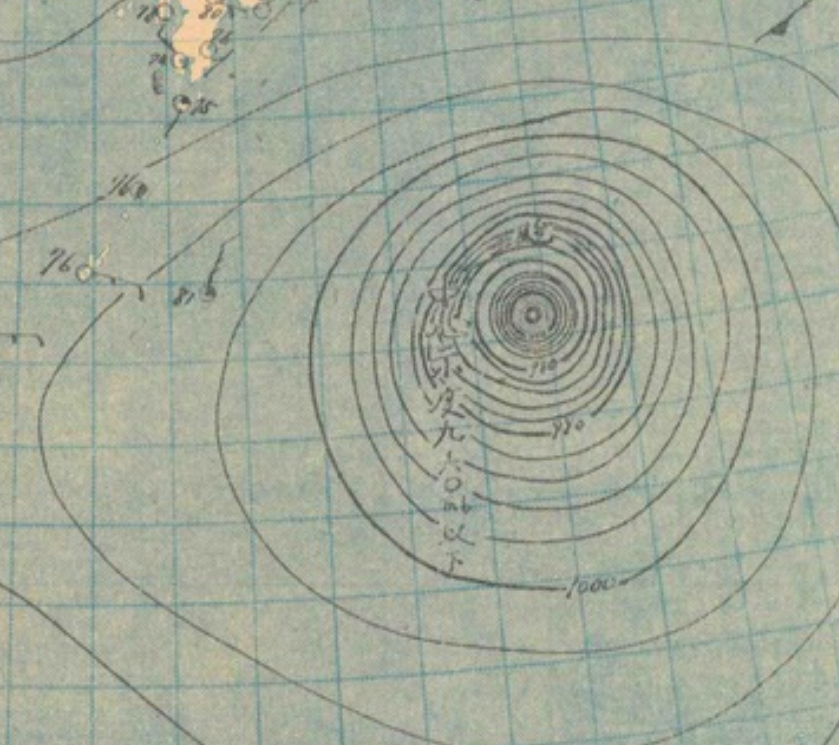
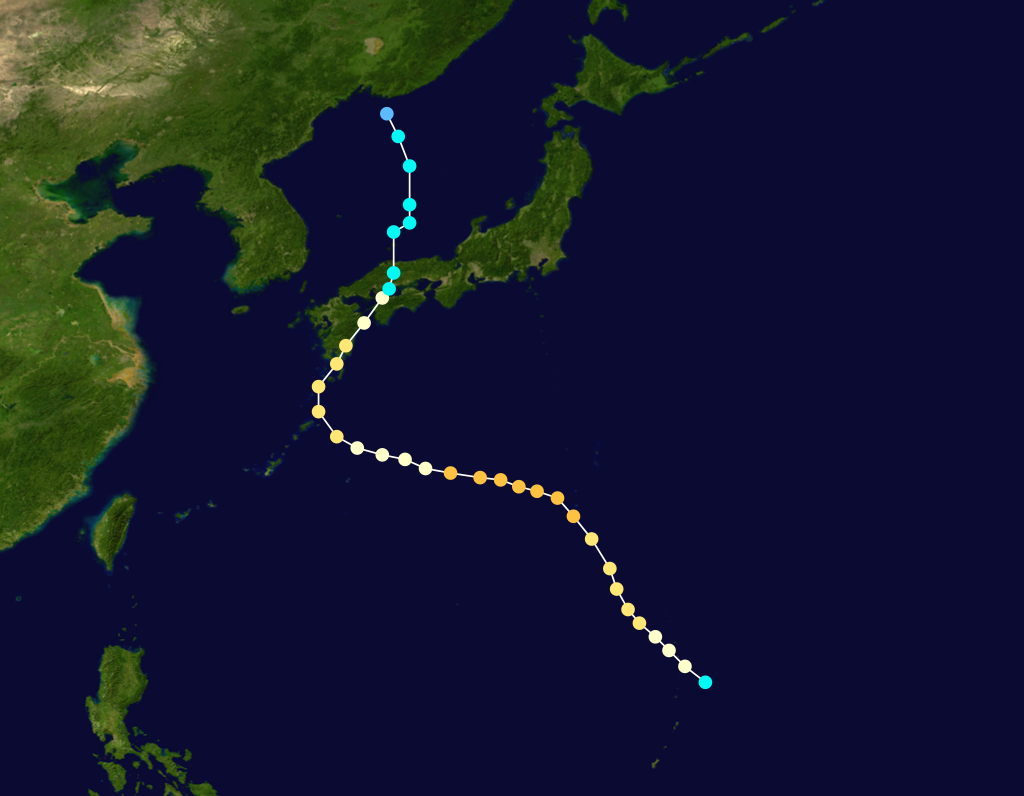
- Duration: July 23 – July 31
- Peak intensity: 185 km/h (115 mph) (1-min); 946 hPa (mbar)

Janie formed on July 23. It moved northwest and then curved west. It was then that it became a Category 3-equivalent typhoon with 115 mph winds. After heading westward for a while, Janie began curving the opposite direction. But that was short-lived; it began moving northwest and struck southern Japan. Janie traveled over the island and dissipated near Russia's coast on July 31.

=== Typhoon Lilly ===
- Typhoon (JMA)
- Category 4 typhoon (SSHWS)
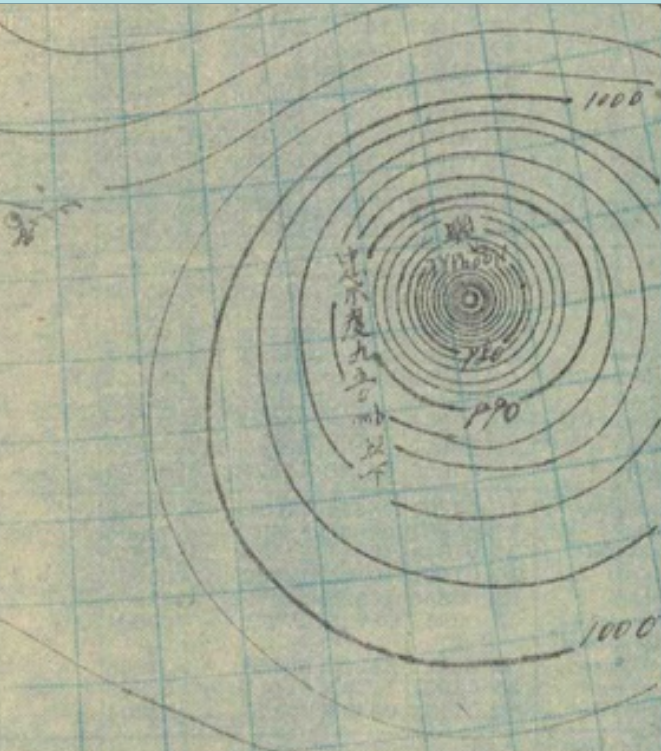
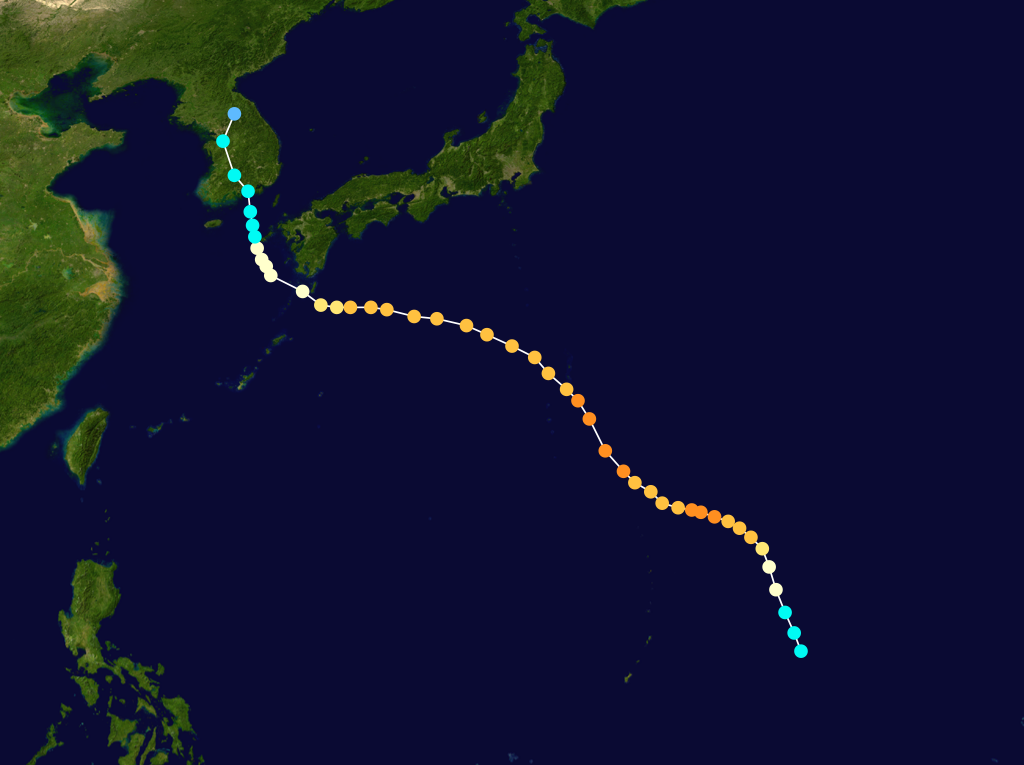
- Duration: August 10 – August 21
- Peak intensity: 230 km/h (145 mph) (1-min); 927 hPa (mbar)

On August 10, a disturbance managed to organize itself enough to be designated Tropical Storm Lilly. It moved in a generally northwest direction while intensifying at a moderate pace-becoming Typhoon Lilly shortly after its formation. Before Lilly moved over cold waters, it attained a peak intensity of 145 mph. It narrowly missed Japan's shoreline as a Category 2-equivalent typhoon before striking Korea as a moderate tropical storm. Lilly dissipated on August 21, after eleven days of traveling in the western Pacific Ocean.

=== Tropical Storm Maggie ===
- Typhoon (JMA)
- Tropical storm (SSHWS)
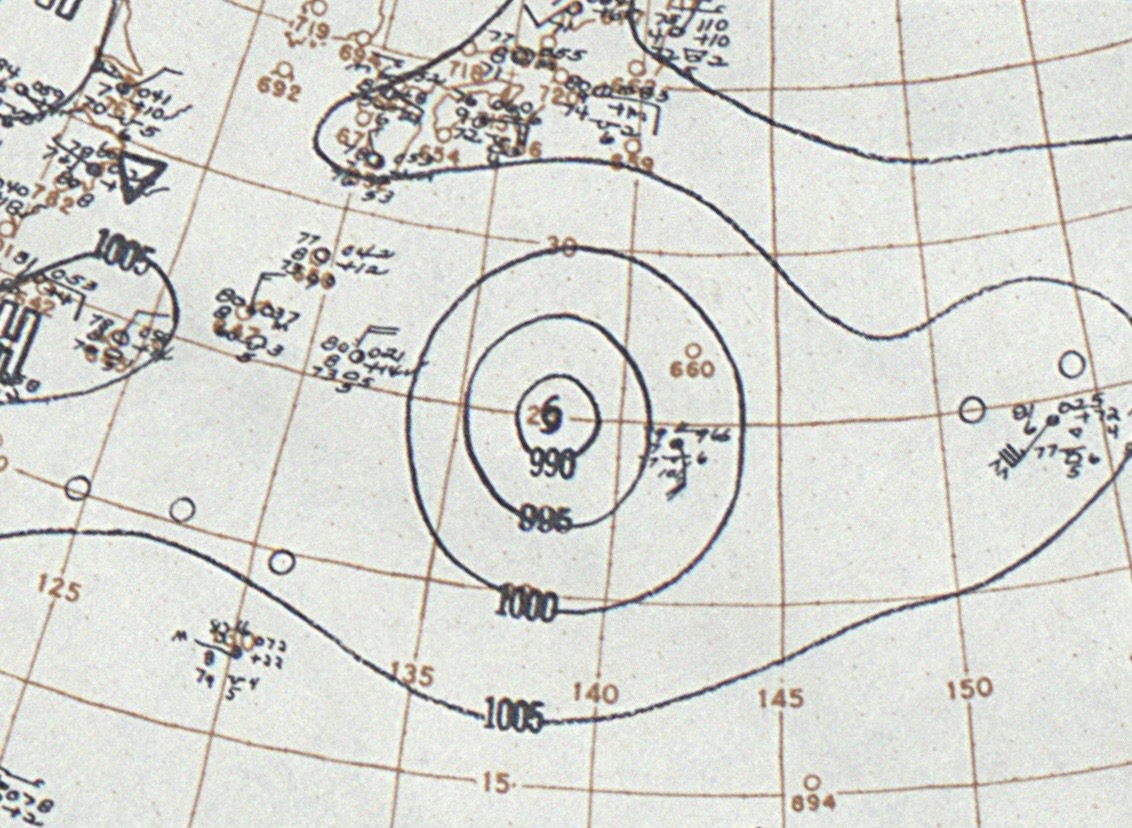
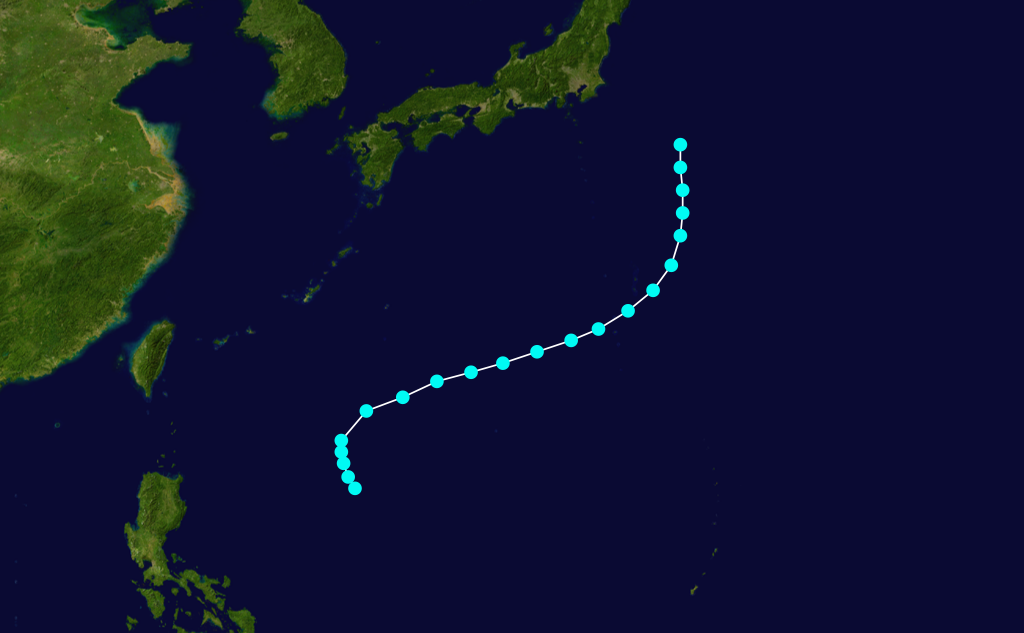
- Duration: August 22 – August 27
- Peak intensity: 110 km/h (70 mph) (1-min); 980 hPa (mbar)

Maggie existed from August 22 to August 27.

=== Early September Typhoon ===
- Typhoon (JMA)
- Duration: September 4 – September 8
- Peak intensity: Winds not specified; 994 hPa (mbar)

=== Typhoon Opal ===
- Typhoon (JMA)
- Category 3 typhoon (SSHWS)
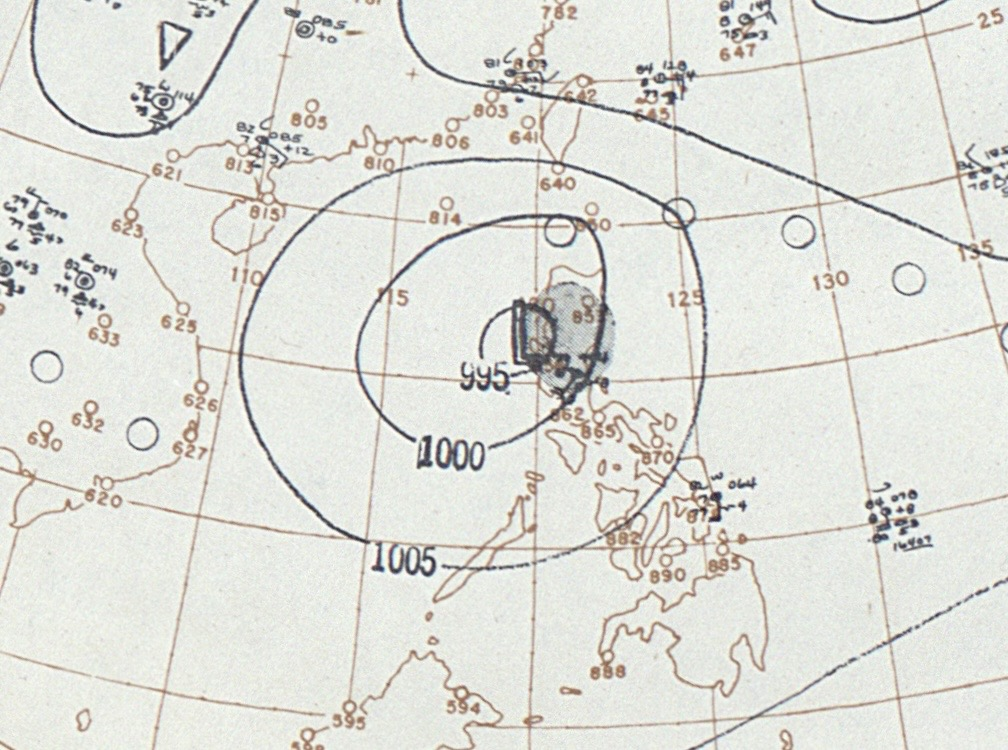
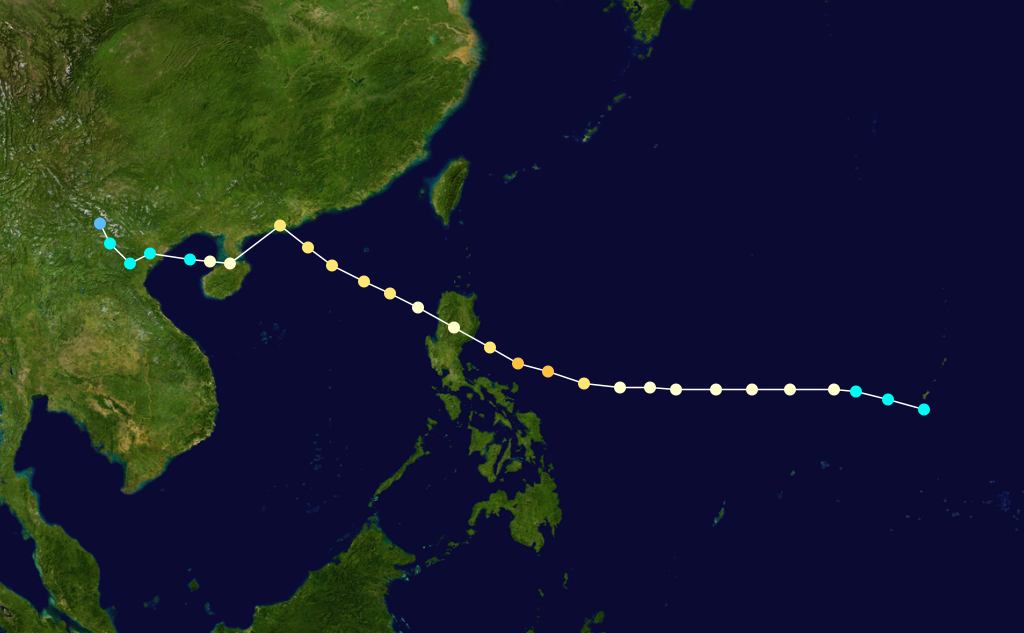
- Duration: September 7 – September 14
- Peak intensity: 185 km/h (115 mph) (1-min); 962 hPa (mbar)

Typhoon Opal is a Tropical Cyclone that formed in the Western Pacific in 1946. It reached Category 3-equivalent status and struck The Philippines and China.

=== Typhoon Priscilla ===
- Typhoon (JMA)
- Category 3 typhoon (SSHWS)
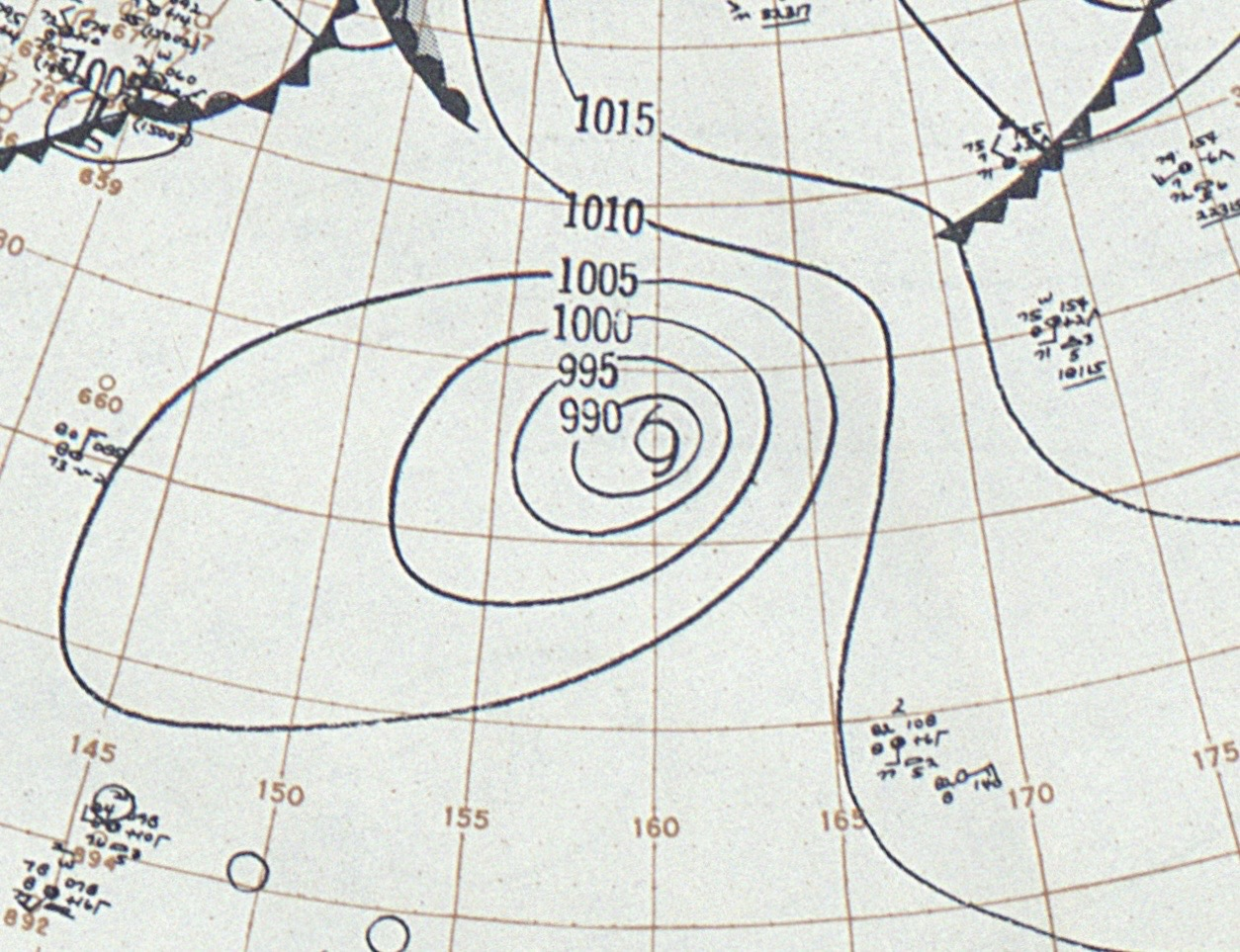
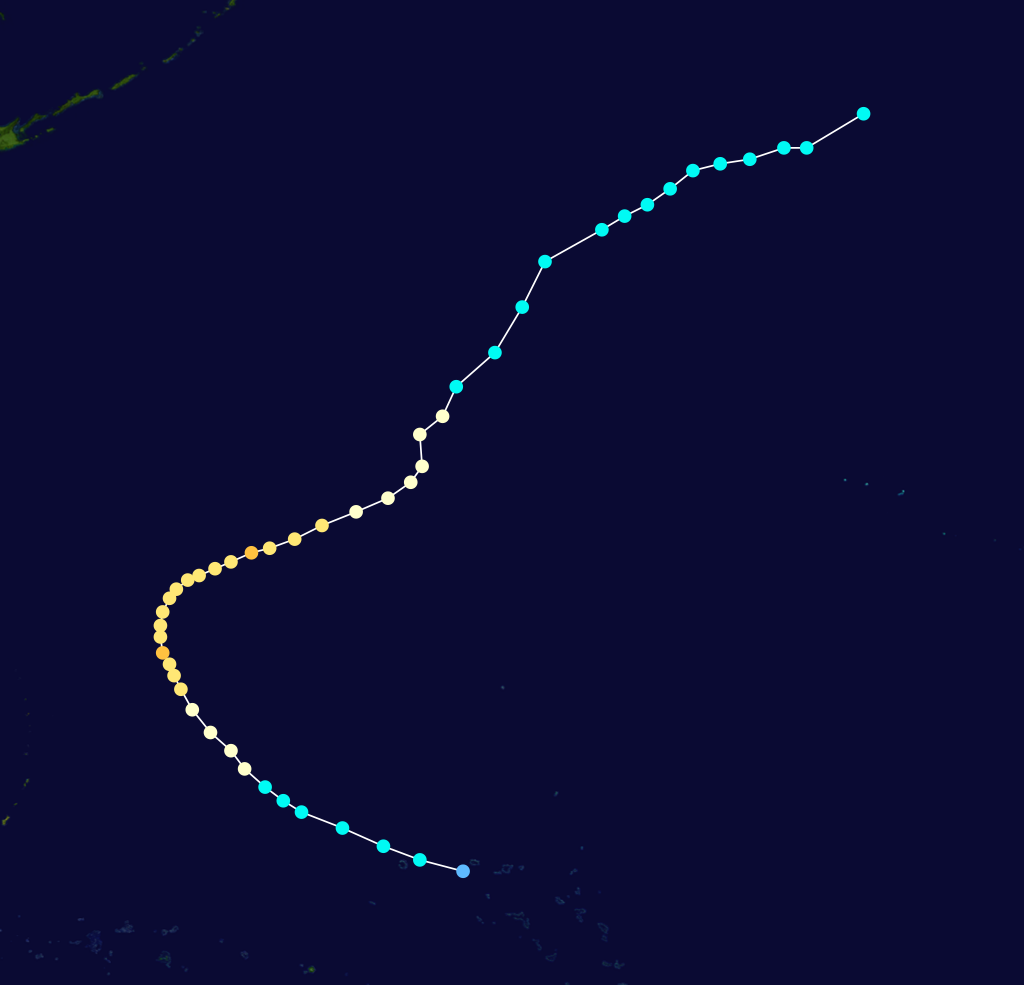
- Duration: September 8 – September 19
- Peak intensity: 185 km/h (115 mph) (1-min); 935 hPa (mbar)

Typhoon Priscilla was a Category 3-equivalent typhoon that stayed out at sea.

=== Typhoon Querida ===
- Typhoon (JMA)
- Category 4 typhoon (SSHWS)
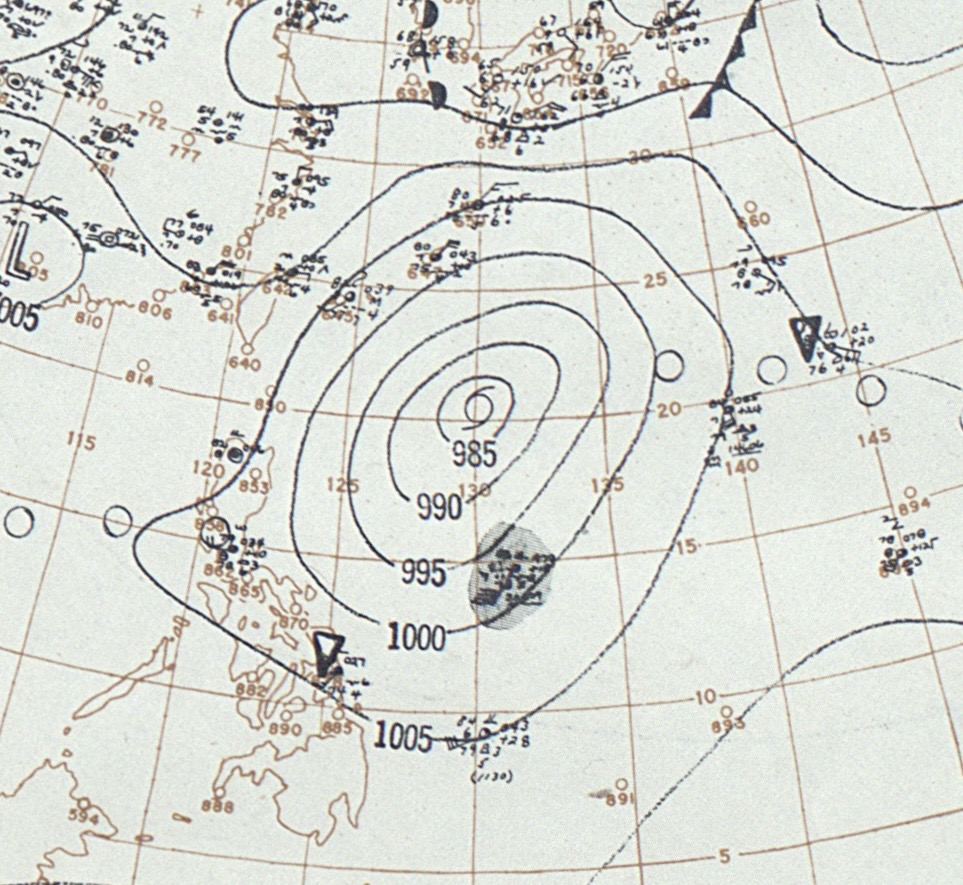
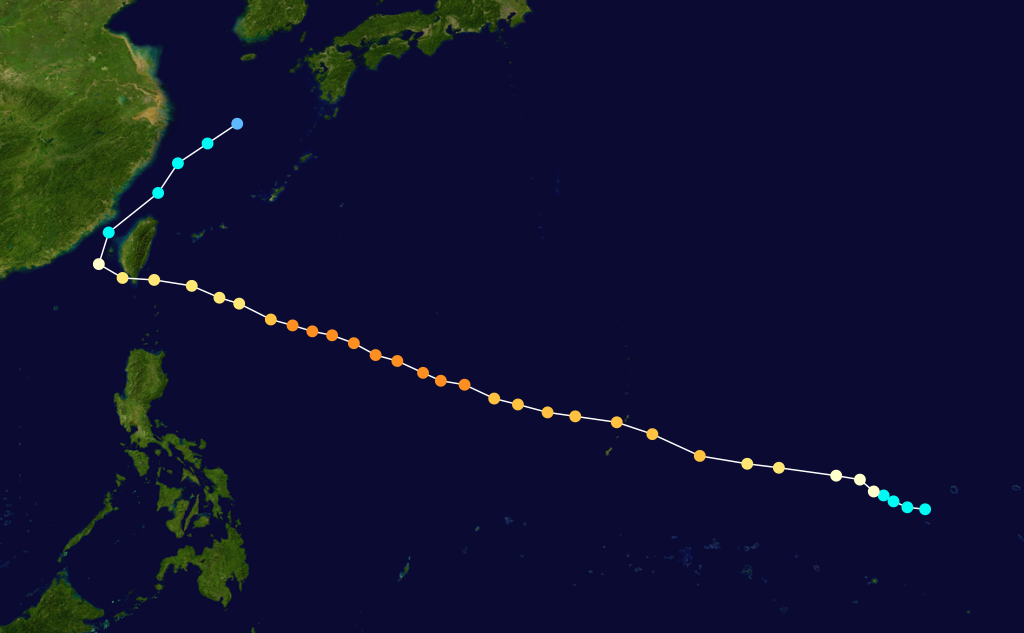
- Duration: September 18 – September 27
- Peak intensity: 220 km/h (140 mph) (1-min); 937 hPa (mbar)

On September 25, the typhoon passed over southern Taiwan with a minimum pressure of 937 millibars (27.7 inHg), producing wind gusts of 198 km/h (123 mph). Across the island, Querida destroyed 373,748 houses, killed 154 people, and injured another 618. The storm also wrecked 564,263 ha (1,394,320 acres) of crops and forestry, killing 28,448 animals.

=== Early October Philippine Typhoon ===
- Typhoon (JMA)
- Duration: October 9 – October 14
- Peak intensity: Winds not specified; 1000 hPa (mbar)

=== Mid October Typhoon ===
- Typhoon (JMA)
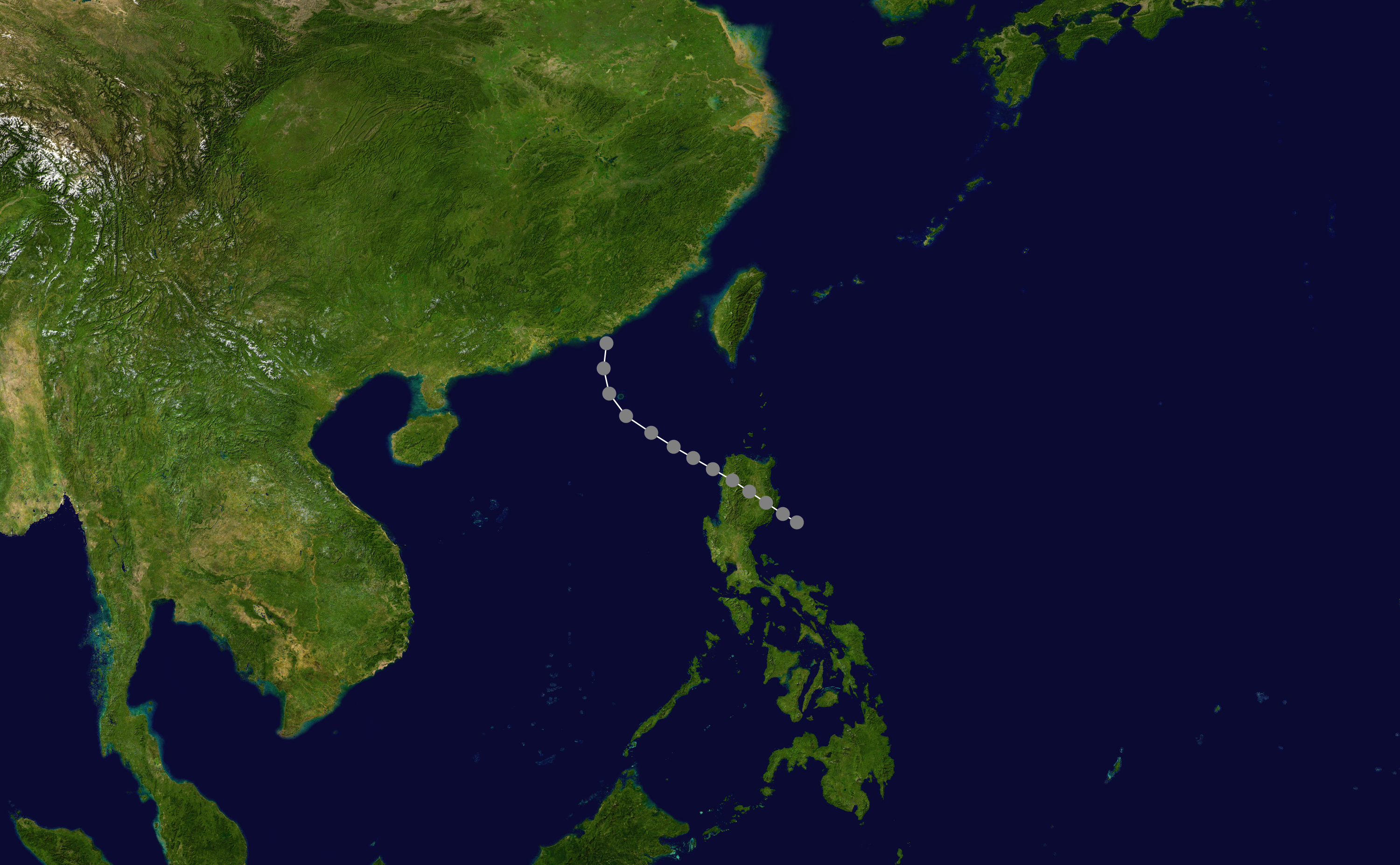
- Duration: October 10 – October 14
- Peak intensity: Winds not specified; 990 hPa (mbar)

=== Typhoon Alma ===
- Typhoon (JMA)
- Category 4 typhoon (SSHWS)
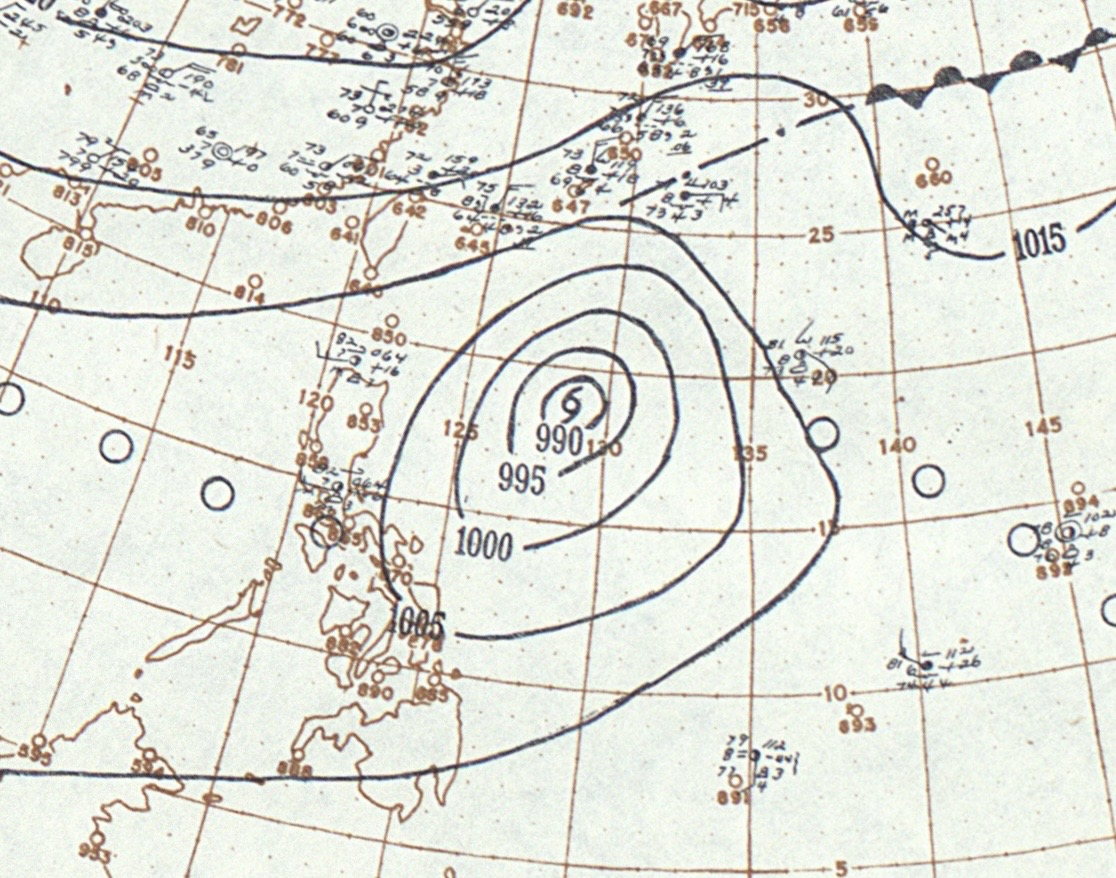
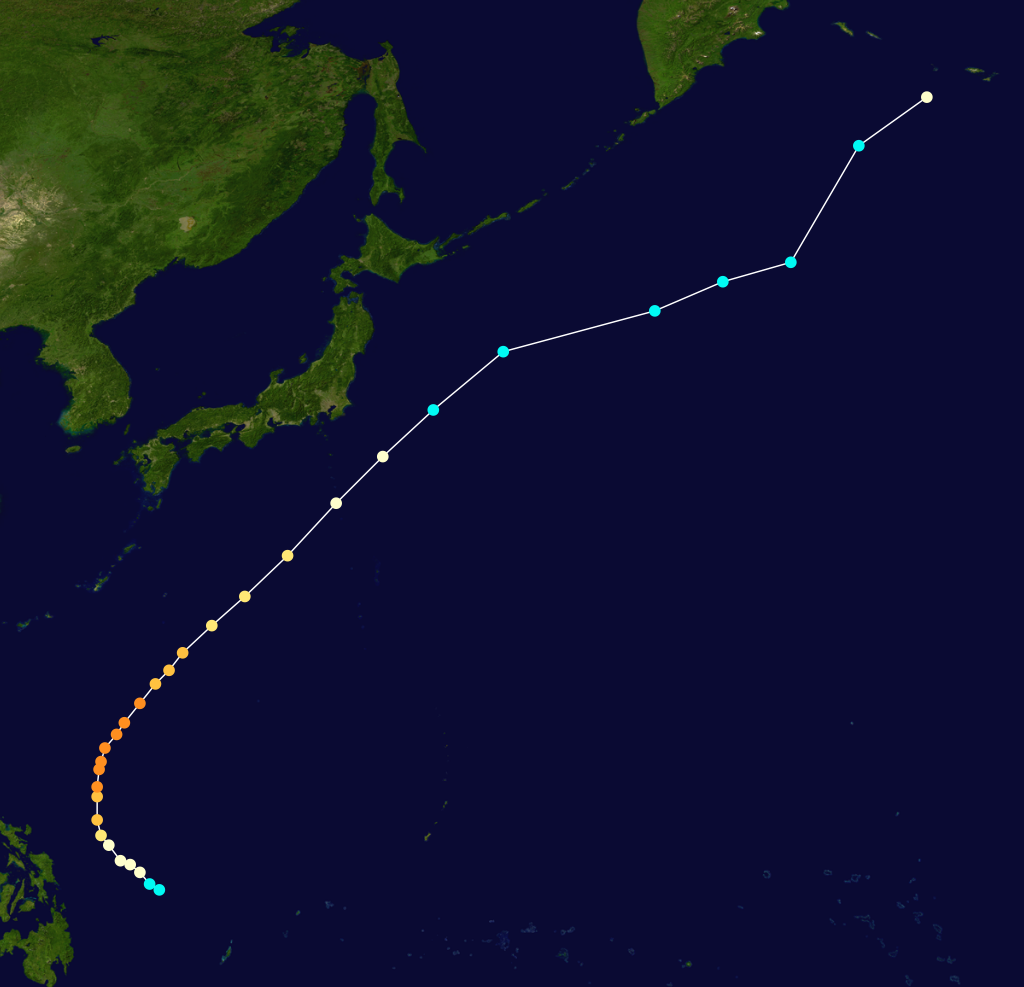
- Duration: October 18 – October 26
- Peak intensity: 220 km/h (140 mph) (1-min); 929 hPa (mbar)

Alma was a Category 4-equivalent typhoon that stayed out at sea.

=== Typhoon Betty ===
- Typhoon (JMA)
- Category 4 typhoon (SSHWS)
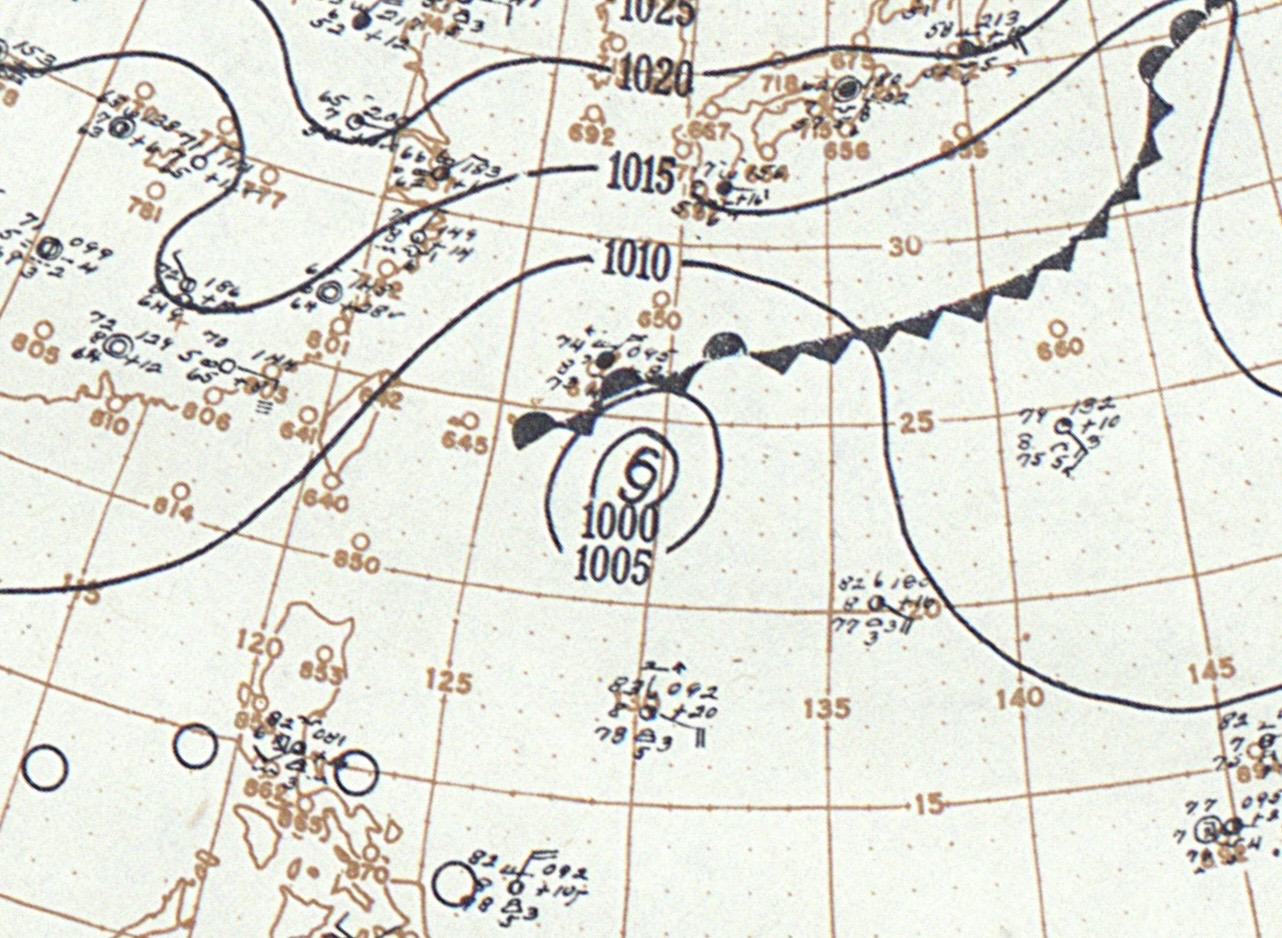
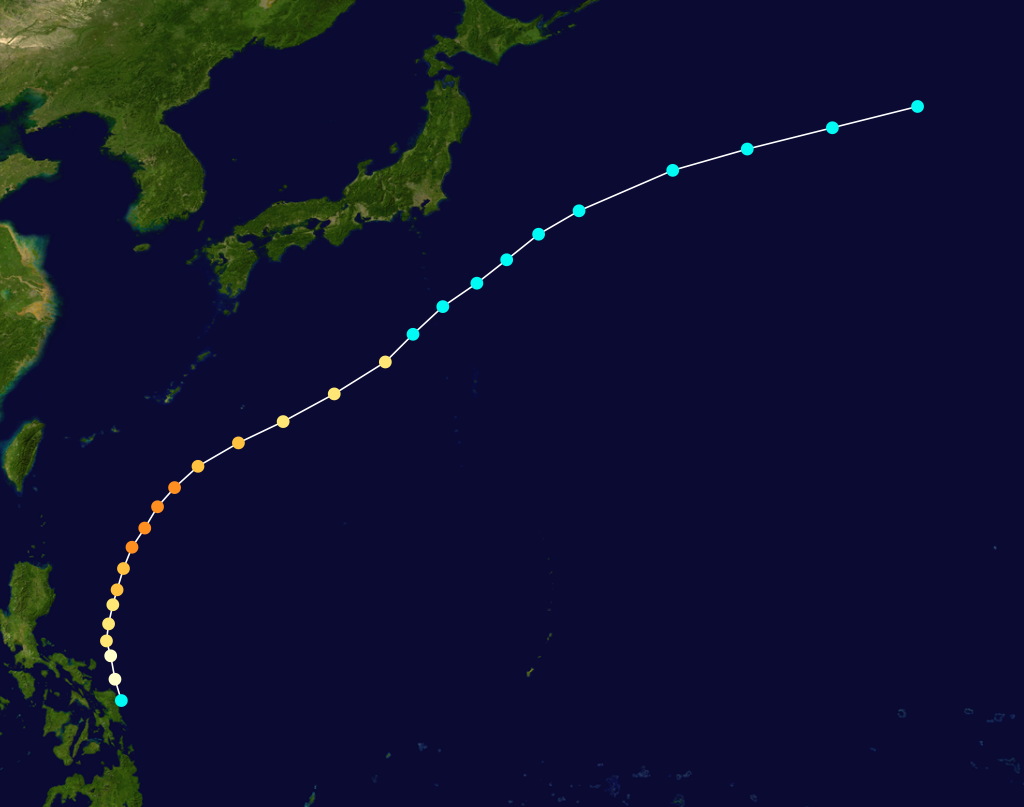
- Duration: November 5 – November 11
- Peak intensity: 220 km/h (140 mph) (1-min); 938 hPa (mbar)

Betty was a Category 4-equivalent typhoon that existed from November 5 to November 11.

=== Typhoon Dianne ===
- Typhoon (JMA)
- Category 2 typhoon (SSHWS)
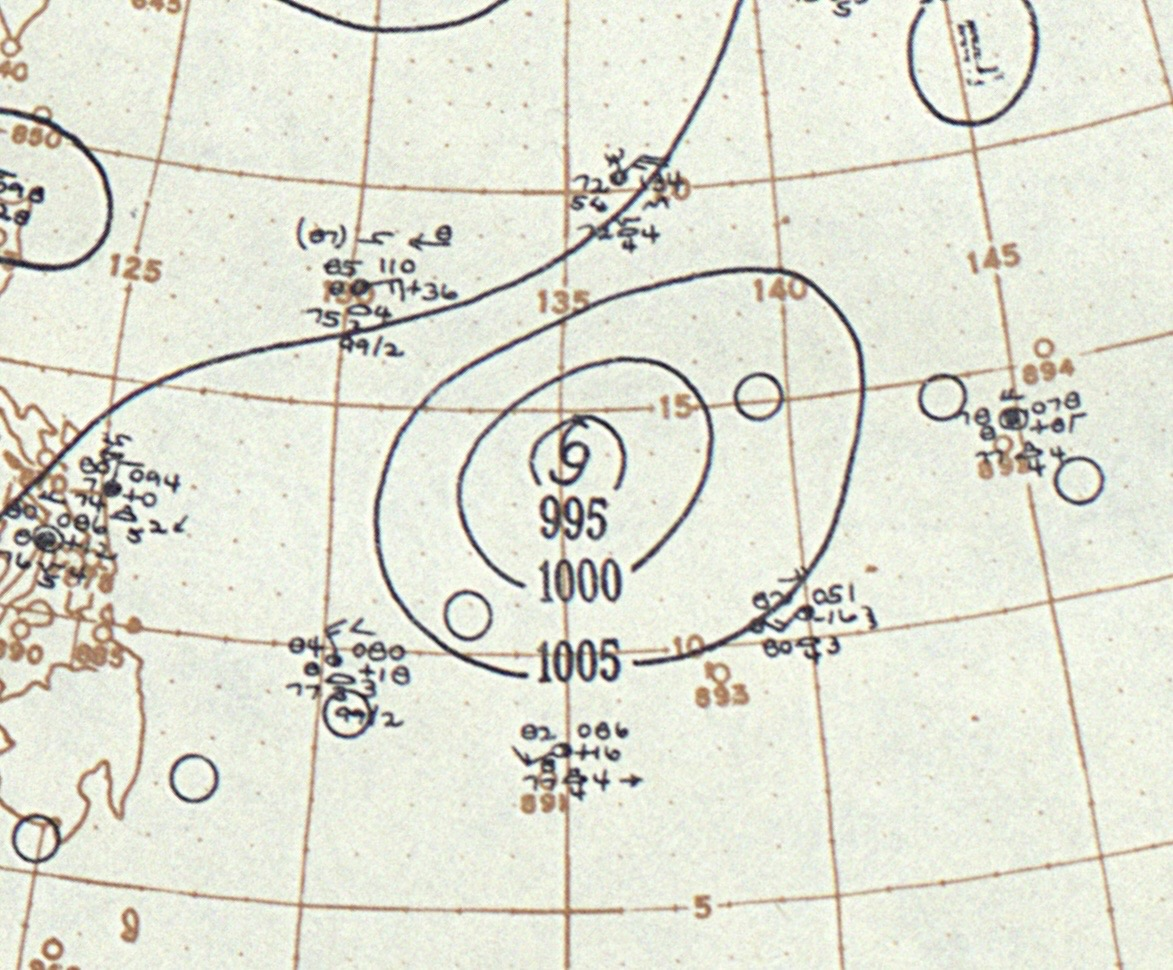
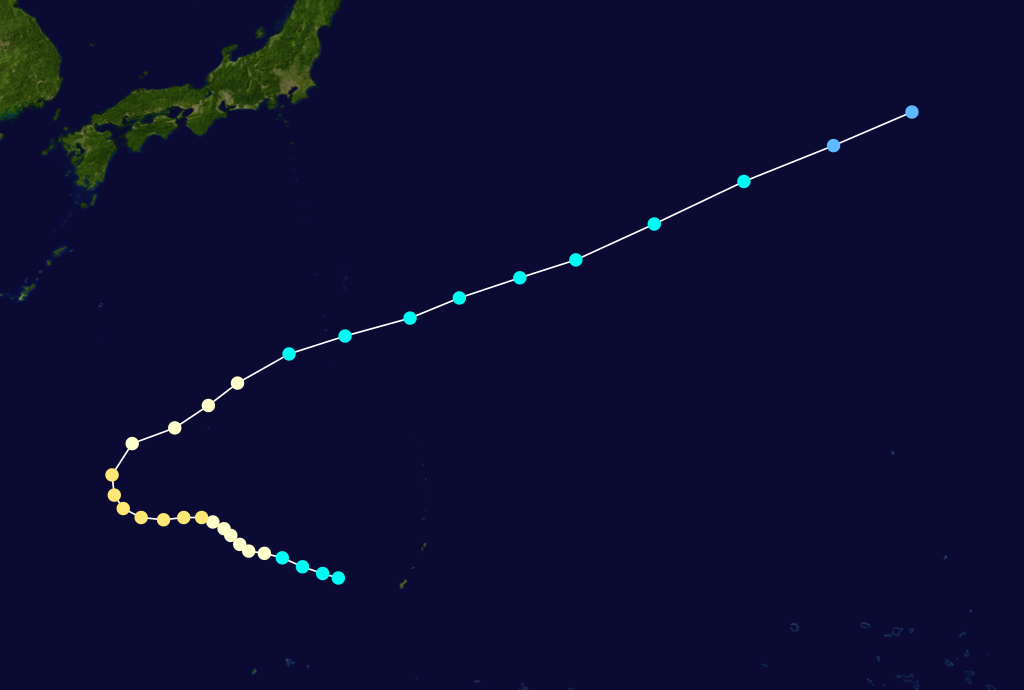
- Duration: November 13 – November 20
- Peak intensity: 175 km/h (110 mph) (1-min); 968 hPa (mbar)

Dianne was a Category 2-equivalent typhoon that stayed out at sea.

== Storm names ==
- Barbara
- Charlotte
- Dolly
- Elinor
- Ginny
- Ingrid
- Janie
- Lilly
- Maggie
- Opal
- Priscilla
- Querida
- Alma
- Betty
- Dianne

== See also ==
- Weather of 1946
- 1946 Atlantic hurricane season
- Pacific typhoon season
- 1900–1950 South-West Indian Ocean cyclone seasons
- 1940s Australian region cyclone seasons
- 1940s South Pacific cyclone seasons
