= 1940s Australian region cyclone seasons =

Seasonal boundaries
- First system formed: February 4, 1940

Seasonal statistics
- Total disturbances: 43
- Total fatalities: Unknown
- Total damage: Unknown

Related article
- 1940s South Pacific cyclone seasons

The following is a list of all reported tropical cyclones within the Australian region between 90°E and 160°E, after the start of World War II in September 1939 and before the start of the satellite era during the 1969–70 Season.

== Systems ==
=== 1940 ===
- February 4–18, 1940 – A tropical cyclone developed to the west of Tuvalu and moved south-westwards through central Vanuatu during February 8. The system subsequently passed to the north of New Caledonia and moved north-westwards into the Australian region, before it made landfall near Cardwell, Queensland during February 18. Within Vanuatu, several small islands to the north of Efate bore the brunt of the cyclone, with most of the citrus, breadfruit and coconut trees on these islands uprooted, while ten missionary churches and several houses were destroyed. Within Queensland, flooding caused a lot of damage to crops and infrastructure in the region between Innisfail and Townsville.
- March 6, 1940 – A tropical cyclone made landfall on Queensland to the north of Cooktown.
- March 17, 1940 – A tropical cyclone made landfall on Queensland near Mackay.
- March 23–24, 1940 – A tropical cyclone made landfall on the Cape York Peninsula, before it moved across the Gulf of Carpentaria from the Edward River to Port Roper.
- April 7, 1940 – A tropical cyclone made landfall on Queensland near Townsville.

=== 1940–41 ===
- March 1–2, 1941 – A tropical cyclone caused flooding in Western Australia's Pilbara.
- April 1-4, 1941- A weak tropical depression scraped the coast Queensland which caused flooding.

=== 1941–42 ===
- February 8, 1942 – A tropical cyclone made landfall on Queensland to the north of Rockhampton.
- February 6–18, 1942 – A tropical cyclone made landfall on Queensland near Cardwell.
- March 24, 1942 – A tropical cyclone impacted Port Hedland in Western Australia, where two lives were lost while the Pier, houses and the Esplandade hotel were damaged.

=== 1942–43 ===
- January 1, 1943 - A tropical cyclone developed off the coast of Queensland and became a strong cyclone while moving out to sea.
- January 31, 1943 – A tropical cyclone made landfall on Queensland near Rockhampton, which caused flooding between Mackay and Maryborough.
- February 9-13, 1943-A weak tropical cyclone made landfall near Airlie Beach causing flooding in the area.
- February 27–28, 1943 – A tropical cyclone impacted Carnarvon and Exmouth in Western Australia destroying banana plantations and other properties.
- March 4–8, 1943 – A tropical cyclone existed to the northwest of New Caledonia.
- March 15, 1943 – A tropical cyclone made landfall near Lancelin and caused extensive damage to the southeast wheatbelt.
- March 28–31, 1943 – A tropical cyclone existed to the west of New Caledonia and moved towards New Zealand.

=== 1943–44 ===
- December 16–17, 1943 – A tropical cyclone made landfall in Queensland's Princess Charlotte Bay, before it entered the Gulf of Carpentaria and made landfall on the Queensland border with the Northern Territory.
- January 16–20, 1944 – A tropical cyclone developed in the Coral Sea and moved south – eastwards to impact New Caledonia.
- March 24, 1944 – A tropical cyclone made landfall on Queensland near Townsville.

=== 1944–45 ===
- January 31, 1945 – A tropical cyclone made landfall on Queensland near Cooktown.
- February 2, 1945 – A tropical cyclone impacted Exmouth, where five people drowned.
- March 6, 1945 – A tropical cyclone impacted Western Australia and caused severe damage to Roebourne and Point Samson, while the Harding River broke its banks and flooded back yards.
- March 17–18, 1945 – A tropical cyclone made landfall on Queensland to the south of Cooktown.

=== 1945–46 ===
- February 8, 1946 – A tropical cyclone made landfall on Queensland near Cardwell.
- February 10–16, 1946 – A tropical cyclone moved westwards across the southern Gulf of Carpentaria and made landfall near the Pellew group of islands.
- February 24 – March 9, 1946 – A tropical cyclone existed in the Coral Sea and impacted the Solomon Islands and New Guinea, before it made landfall on Queensland.
- March 17–25, 1946 – A tropical cyclone existed to the north of Vanuatu and moved south – westwards through the Coral Sea, before it made landfall on Queensland.
- April 4, 1946 – A tropical cyclone passed just to the east of Fraser Island and brought heavy rain to Southern Queensland.

=== 1946–47 ===
- December 31, 1946 – January 5, 1947 – A tropical cyclone existed in the northwest Coral Sea near New Caledonia.
- January 17–24, 1947 – A tropical cyclone moved south-westwards through the Coral Sea before it made landfall on Queensland near Caloundra.
- February 10, 1947 – A tropical cyclone made landfall on Queensland near Broadsound.

=== 1947–48 ===
- January 6, 1948 – A tropical cyclone moved eastwards towards Thursday Island, where significant structure damage was reported.
- January 7, 1948 – A tropical cyclone made landfall on the Cape York Peninsula, with heavy floods reported between Cooktown and Cardwell.
- January 12–13, 1948 – A tropical cyclone made landfall in the Gulf of Carpentaria.
- January 13–17, 1948 – A tropical cyclone existed in the Coral Sea to the north of New Caledonia.
- January 21–30, 1948 – A tropical cyclone impacted Vanuatu and New Caledonia, before it moved southwards and impacted Lord Howe Island.
- February 23, 1948 – A tropical cyclone moved from the Groote Eylandt area and made landfall to the west of Mornington Island.
- March 6, 1948 – A tropical cyclone flattened the Johnston homestead on Vanderlin Island and caused the island to be split into three separate islets.
- March 19–26, 1948 – A tropical cyclone existed to the south of the Solomon Islands.
- March 24, 1948 – A tropical cyclone recurved over Fraser Island.

=== 1948–49 ===
- January 10–14, 1949 – A tropical cyclone moved south-eastwards through the Coral Sea from Queensland and impacted New Caledonia.
- February 7–17, 1949 – A tropical cyclone existed within the Northern Coral Sea and made landfall on Queensland to the north of Lord Howe Island.
- February 10, 1949 – A tropical cyclone made landfall on Queensland to the north of Cooktown.
- March 2–3, 1949 – A tropical cyclone made landfall on Queensland and passed over Gladstone and Rockhampton.
- March 25–29, 1949 – A tropical cyclone existed in the Northern Coral Sea and moved south-southeastwards near New Caledonia.

=== 1949–50 ===
- January 15, 1950 – A tropical cyclone recurved near Cooktown.
- January 15–19, 1950 – A tropical cyclone made landfall near Mornington Island and moved through Queensland to Sydney in New South Wales.
- January 22–27, 1950 – A possible tropical cyclone existed to the north of New Caledonia and moved south-eastwards.
- February 27–28, 1950 – A tropical cyclone recurved over Gladstone and Hervey Bay.
- March 11, 1950 – A tropical cyclone made landfall on Queensland near Carmilla.

== See also ==
- Australian region tropical cyclone
- 1900–1950 South-West Indian Ocean cyclone seasons
- Atlantic hurricane seasons: 1940, 1941, 1942, 1943, 1944, 1945, 1946, 1947, 1948, 1949
- Eastern Pacific hurricane seasons: 1940, 1941, 1942, 1943, 1944, 1945, 1946, 1947, 1948, 1949
- Western Pacific typhoon seasons: 1940, 1941, 1942, 1943, 1944, 1945, 1946, 1947, 1948, 1949
- North Indian Ocean cyclone seasons: 1940, 1941, 1942, 1943, 1944, 1945, 1946, 1947, 1948, 1949
