= 1902–1919 Pacific typhoon seasons =

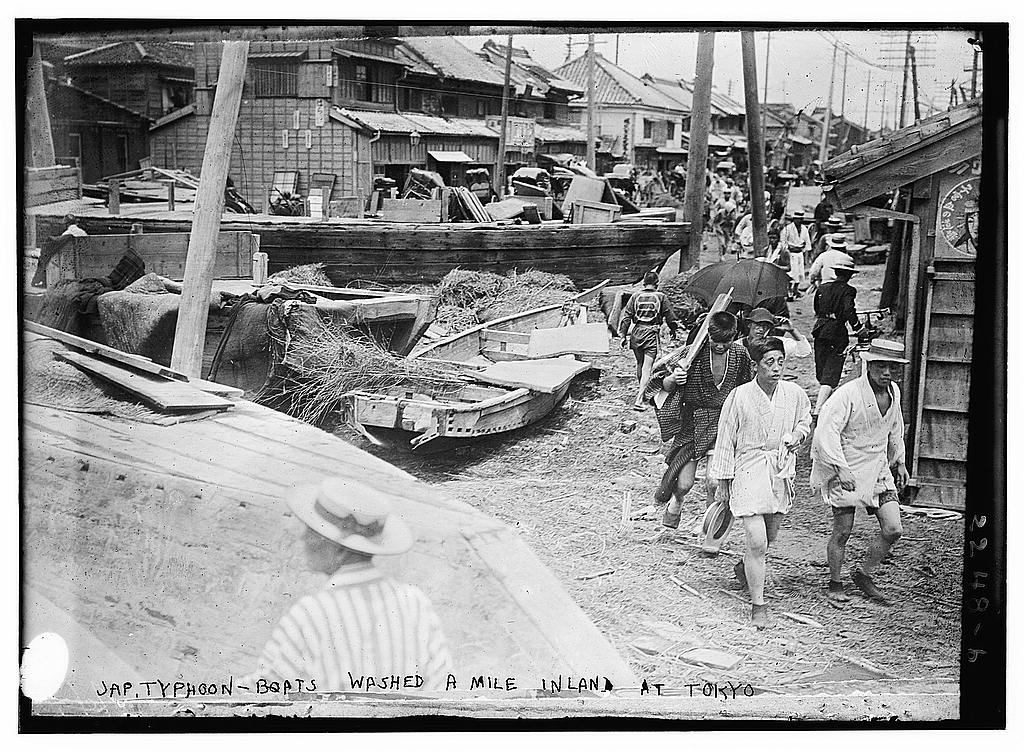
Boats washed a mile inland, in Kanto, Japan ca 1910.

The following is a list of Pacific typhoon seasons from 1902 to 1919. Data from these years was extremely unreliable, so there were many more typhoons that did not hit land and were not detected by ships.

Pacific typhoon seasons

1900, 1901, 1902–1919, 1920–1937, 1938

== 1902 ==
1902–1919 Pacific typhoon seasons

Seasonal boundaries
- First system formed: January 1902
- Last system dissipated: December 1902

Seasonal statistics
- Total depressions: 24
- Total fatalities: >1300 Total
- Total damage: Unknown

Related articles
- 1902 Atlantic hurricane season; 1900–09 Pacific hurricane seasons; 1900s North Indian Ocean cyclone seasons

== 1903 ==
1902–1919 Pacific typhoon seasons

Seasonal boundaries
- First system formed: January 1903
- Last system dissipated: December 1903

Seasonal statistics
- Total depressions: 31
- Total fatalities: Unknown
- Total damage: Unknown

Related articles
- 1903 Atlantic hurricane season; 1900–09 Pacific hurricane seasons; 1900s North Indian Ocean cyclone seasons

In 1903, there were 31 tropical cyclones in the western Pacific Ocean that were detected by ships or ground stations nearby.

== 1904 ==
1902–1919 Pacific typhoon seasons

Seasonal boundaries
- First system formed: March 1904
- Last system dissipated: December 1904

Seasonal statistics
- Total depressions: 23
- Total fatalities: Unknown
- Total damage: Unknown

Related articles
- 1904 Atlantic hurricane season; 1900–09 Pacific hurricane seasons; 1900s North Indian Ocean cyclone seasons

In 1904, there were 31 tropical cyclones in the western Pacific Ocean.

From September 7–12, a typhoon left at least 4,000 fatalities in Vietnam.

== 1905 ==
1902–1919 Pacific typhoon seasons

Seasonal boundaries
- First system formed: January 1905
- Last system dissipated: December 1905

Seasonal statistics
- Total depressions: 24
- Total fatalities: 496
- Total damage: Unknown

Related articles
- 1905 Atlantic hurricane season; 1900–09 Pacific hurricane seasons; 1900s North Indian Ocean cyclone seasons

In 1905, there were 24 tropical cyclones in the western Pacific Ocean.

On April 20, a typhoon struck the Marshall Islands, killing 26 people. On June 30, another typhoon moved through the Marshall Islands, killing 230 people.

From September 21–29, a typhoon moved across the Philippines, killing more than 240 people.

== 1906 ==
1902–1919 Pacific typhoon seasons

Seasonal boundaries
- First system formed: January 1906
- Last system dissipated: November 1906

Seasonal statistics
- Total depressions: 24
- Total fatalities: 15,000
- Total damage: $20 million (1906 USD)

Related articles
- 1906 Atlantic hurricane season; 1900–09 Pacific hurricane seasons; 1900s North Indian Ocean cyclone seasons

In 1906, there were 24 tropical cyclones in the western Pacific Ocean.

=== Hong Kong typhoon ===
- Typhoon (JMA)
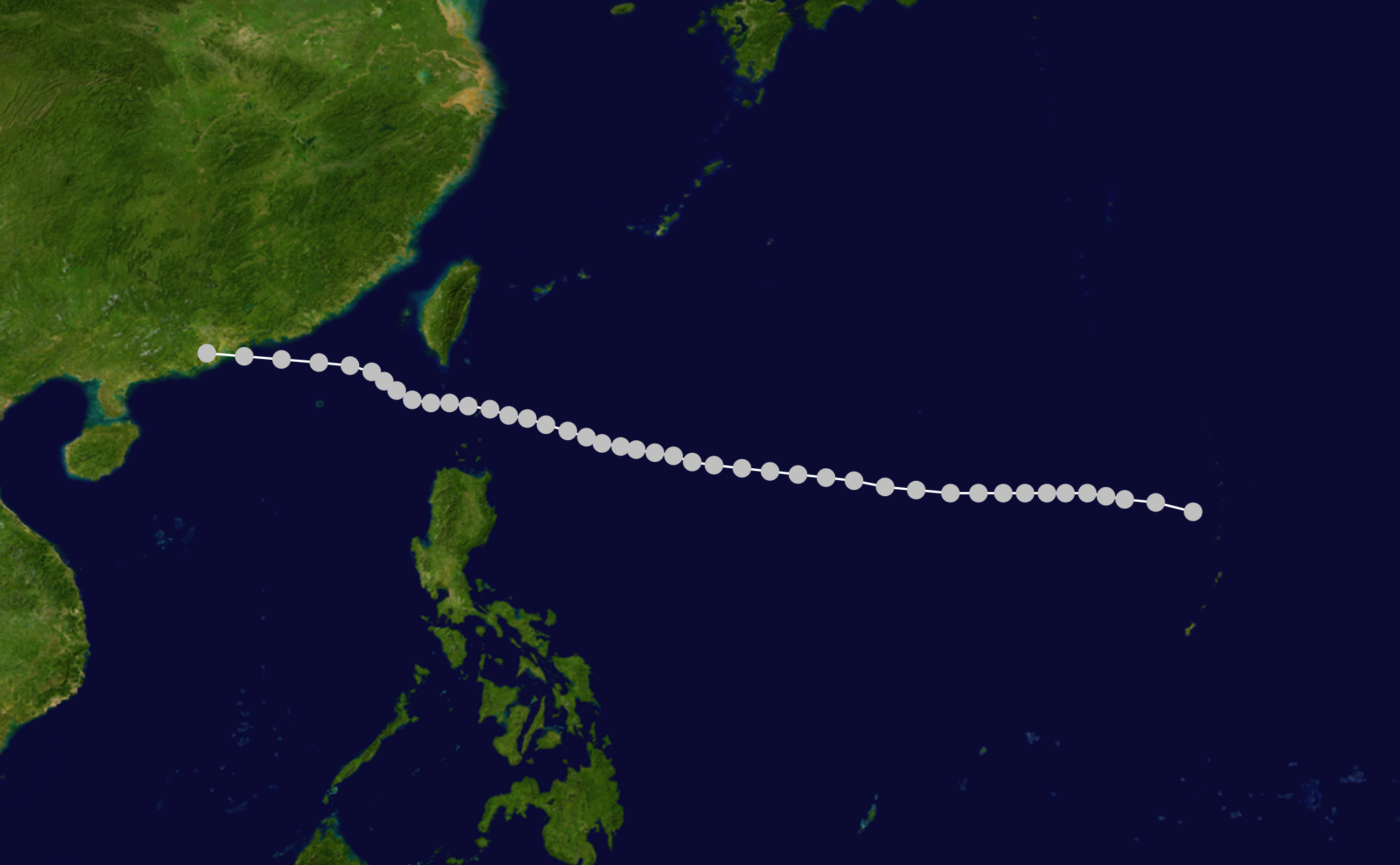
- Duration: September 18 – September 18
- Peak intensity: Winds not specified; 984 hPa (mbar)

In September 1906, a typhoon struck China near Hong Kong, killing around 15,000 people, and causing US$20 million in damage.

== 1907 ==
1902–1919 Pacific typhoon seasons

Seasonal boundaries
- First system formed: January 1906
- Last system dissipated: November 1906

Seasonal statistics
- Total depressions: 32
- Total fatalities: 473
- Total damage: Unknown

Related articles
- 1907 Atlantic hurricane season; 1900–09 Pacific hurricane seasons; 1900s North Indian Ocean cyclone seasons

In 1907, there were 32 tropical cyclones in the western Pacific Ocean.

From March 26–27, a typhoon moved through the Caroline Islands, killing 473 people in the archipelago.

== 1908 ==
1902–1919 Pacific typhoon seasons

Seasonal boundaries
- First system formed: January 1908
- Last system dissipated: December 1908

Seasonal statistics
- Total depressions: 31
- Total fatalities: 428
- Total damage: Unknown

Related articles
- 1908 Atlantic hurricane season; 1900–09 Pacific hurricane seasons; 1900s North Indian Ocean cyclone seasons

In 1908, there were 31 tropical cyclones in the western Pacific Ocean.

=== Hong Kong typhoon ===
- Duration: July 25 – July 28
- Peak intensity: Winds not specified;

A typhoon struck near Hong Kong, killing 428 people.

== 1909 ==
1902–1919 Pacific typhoon seasons

Seasonal boundaries
- First system formed: January 1909
- Last system dissipated: December 1909

Seasonal statistics
- Total depressions: 35
- Total fatalities: Unknown
- Total damage: Unknown

Related articles
- 1909 Atlantic hurricane season; 1900–09 Pacific hurricane seasons; 1900s North Indian Ocean cyclone seasons

In 1909, there were 35 tropical cyclones in the western Pacific Ocean.

There is a typhoon with the winds of 135 mph (217 km/h). The typhoon impacted Philippines and caused an instrument to be destroyed.

== 1910 ==
1902–1919 Pacific typhoon seasons

Seasonal boundaries
- First system formed: January 1910
- Last system dissipated: December 1910

Seasonal statistics
- Total depressions: 38
- Total fatalities: Unknown
- Total damage: Unknown

Related articles
- 1910 Atlantic hurricane season; 1910–19 Pacific hurricane seasons; 1910s North Indian Ocean cyclone seasons

In 1910, there were 38 tropical cyclones in the western Pacific Ocean.

== 1911 ==
1902–1919 Pacific typhoon seasons

Seasonal boundaries
- First system formed: January 1911
- Last system dissipated: December 1911

Seasonal statistics
- Total depressions: 30
- Total fatalities: Unknown
- Total damage: Unknown

Related articles
- 1911 Atlantic hurricane season; 1910–19 Pacific hurricane seasons; 1910s North Indian Ocean cyclone seasons

In 1911, there were 30 tropical cyclones in the western Pacific Ocean.

A storm was first observed south of Guam on August 21 and moved on a westward trajectory. On August 26, the track shifted more to the west-northwest, bringing it over the Batanes islands offshore northern Luzon. That night, the storm approached southwest coast of Taiwan (then known as Formosa) with great intensity, possibly moving over the island. Kaohsiung reported a minimum pressure of 937 mbar (27.63 inHg), the lowest-ever recorded pressure on the island as of 1955, as well as maximum sustained winds of 177 km/h (110 mph) before the anemometer broke. Peak winds there were estimated around 251 km/h (156 mph), based on the severity of the airborne debris. Elsewhere on the island, the highest recorded wind speed was 196 km/h (122 mph). Across Taiwan, the typhoon destroyed over 30,000 houses, injured 378, and killed 305 people. The storm made landfall in eastern China on August 27 and continued northward for three more days.

== 1912 ==
1902–1919 Pacific typhoon seasons

Seasonal boundaries
- First system formed: January 1912
- Last system dissipated: December 1912

Seasonal statistics
- Total depressions: 27
- Total fatalities: 51,002
- Total damage: $20 million (1912 USD)

Related articles
- 1912 Atlantic hurricane season; 1910–19 Pacific hurricane seasons; 1910s North Indian Ocean cyclone seasons

In 1912, there were 27 tropical cyclones in the western Pacific Ocean.

=== China typhoon ===
- Typhoon (JMA)
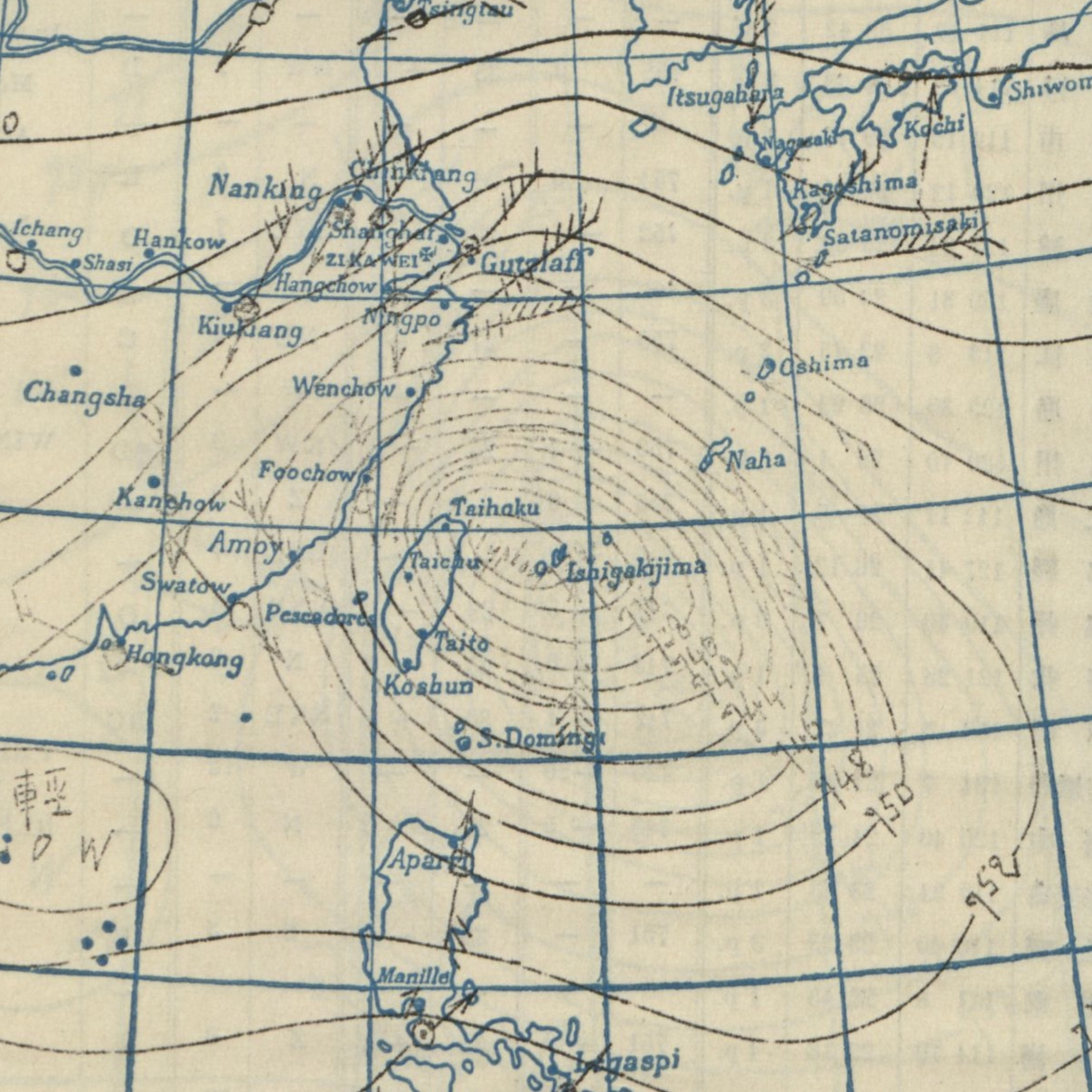
- Duration: August 25 – September 1
- Peak intensity: Winds not specified; 946 hPa (mbar)

In August, a typhoon struck near Wenzhou, China, killing 50,000 people.

=== Japan typhoon ===
In September, a typhoon killed 1,000 people and left US$20 million in damage when it struck Japan and sank the SS Kiche Maru.

=== Tacloban typhoon ===
In November, typhoon struck Tacloban, Philippines, killing 15,000 people.

=== Palau typhoon ===
On November 26, a typhoon struck Palau, killing two people.

== 1913 ==
1902–1919 Pacific typhoon seasons

Seasonal boundaries
- First system formed: January 1913
- Last system dissipated: December 1913

Seasonal statistics
- Total depressions: 23
- Total fatalities: Unknown
- Total damage: Unknown

Related articles
- 1913 Atlantic hurricane season; 1910–19 Pacific hurricane seasons; 1910s North Indian Ocean cyclone seasons

In 1913, there were 23 tropical cyclones in the western Pacific Ocean.

On November 10, a typhoon hit Guam. The USS Ajax was wrecked during the storm. A hospital steward was reported to have been killed, though they were later found alive.

== 1914 ==
1902–1919 Pacific typhoon seasons

Seasonal boundaries
- First system formed: March 1914
- Last system dissipated: December 1914

Seasonal statistics
- Total depressions: 25
- Total fatalities: Unknown
- Total damage: Unknown

Related articles
- 1914 Atlantic hurricane season; 1910–19 Pacific hurricane seasons; 1910s North Indian Ocean cyclone seasons

In 1914, there were 25 tropical cyclones in the western Pacific Ocean.

== 1915 ==
1902–1919 Pacific typhoon seasons

Seasonal boundaries
- First system formed: March 1915
- Last system dissipated: December 1915

Seasonal statistics
- Total depressions: 23
- Total fatalities: Unknown
- Total damage: Unknown

Related articles
- 1915 Atlantic hurricane season; 1910–19 Pacific hurricane seasons; 1910s North Indian Ocean cyclone seasons

In 1915, there were 23 tropical cyclones in the western Pacific Ocean.

== 1916 ==
1902–1919 Pacific typhoon seasons

Seasonal boundaries
- First system formed: January 1916
- Last system dissipated: December 1916

Seasonal statistics
- Total depressions: 23
- Total fatalities: Unknown
- Total damage: Unknown

Related articles
- 1916 Atlantic hurricane season; 1910–19 Pacific hurricane seasons; 1910s North Indian Ocean cyclone seasons

In 1916, there were 23 tropical cyclones in the western Pacific Ocean.

== 1917 ==
1902–1919 Pacific typhoon seasons

Seasonal boundaries
- First system formed: March 1917
- Last system dissipated: November 1917

Seasonal statistics
- Total depressions: 16
- Total fatalities: 4,000
- Total damage: $50 million (1916 USD)

Related articles
- 1917 Atlantic hurricane season; 1910–19 Pacific hurricane seasons; 1910s North Indian Ocean cyclone seasons

In 1917, there were 16 tropical cyclones in the western Pacific Ocean.

In September, a typhoon struck the Japanese island of Honshu, killing 4,000 people and leaving US$50 million in damage.

== 1918 ==
1902–1919 Pacific typhoon seasons

Seasonal boundaries
- First system formed: March 1916
- Last system dissipated: October 1916

Seasonal statistics
- Total depressions: 16
- Total fatalities: 129
- Total damage: Unknown

Related articles
- 1918 Atlantic hurricane season; 1910–19 Pacific hurricane seasons; 1910s North Indian Ocean cyclone seasons

In 1918, there were 16 tropical cyclones in the western Pacific Ocean.

In November, a typhoon killed 129 people when it struck Majuro in the Marshall Islands.

== 1919 ==
1902–1919 Pacific typhoon seasons

Seasonal boundaries
- First system formed: January 1919
- Last system dissipated: December 1919

Seasonal statistics
- Total depressions: 26
- Total fatalities: Unknown
- Total damage: Unknown

Related articles
- 1916 Atlantic hurricane season; 1910–19 Pacific hurricane seasons; 1910s North Indian Ocean cyclone seasons

In 1919, there were 26 tropical cyclones in the western Pacific Ocean.

== Gallery ==
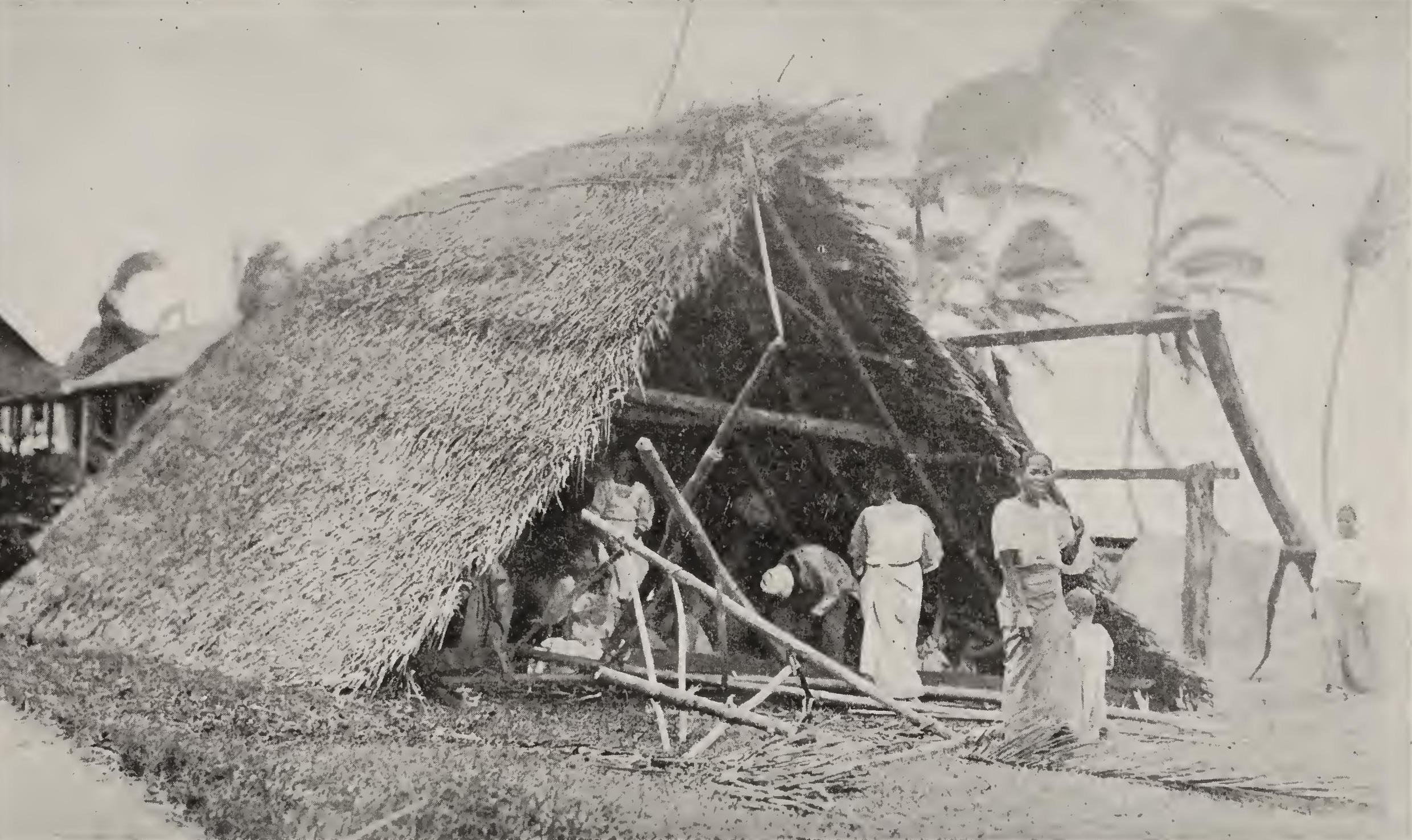
Damage after 1914 typhoon (Guam)

== See also ==
- 1900–1940 South Pacific cyclone seasons
- 1900–1950 South-West Indian Ocean cyclone seasons
- 1900s Australian region cyclone seasons
- 1910s Australian region cyclone seasons
