= 1917 Atlantic hurricane season =

- Season summary map

Seasonal boundaries
- First system formed: July 6, 1917
- Last system dissipated: October 20, 1917

Strongest storm
- Name: "Nueva Gerona"
  - Maximum winds: 150 mph (240 km/h) (1-minute sustained)
  - Lowest pressure: 928 mbar (hPa; 27.4 inHg)

Seasonal statistics
- Total depressions: 9
- Total storms: 4
- Hurricanes: 2
- Major hurricanes (Cat. 3+): 2
- Total fatalities: 86 total
- Total damage: $2.17 million (1917 USD)

Related articles
- 1910–19 Pacific hurricane seasons; 1902-19 Pacific typhoon seasons; 1910s North Indian Ocean cyclone seasons

The 1917 Atlantic hurricane season featured nine known tropical cyclones, four of which became tropical storms. The first system appeared on July 6 east of the Windward Islands. After crossing the islands and traversing the Caribbean Sea, the storm struck Honduras, Belize, and Mexico, before dissipating on July 14. After more than three weeks without tropical cyclogenesis, another tropical storm developed west of Bermuda. As the storm brushed eastern New England, four ships sank near Nantucket, causing 41 fatalities. The same cyclone brought damaging winds to Nova Scotia before transitioning into an extratropical cyclone on August 10.

A hurricane developed over the central Atlantic Ocean on August 30 and ultimately affected Bermuda with heightened tides as it passed to the east. Elsewhere, the hurricane had little impact, becoming extratropical on September 5. After the third system, a series of four tropical depressions formed, but failed to become severe. The fourth hurricane brought devastation to Jamaica, Cuba, and portions of the Gulf Coast of the United States, especially western parts of the Florida Panhandle. Overall, the storm killed at least 45 deaths and inflicted over $2.17 million (1917 USD) in damage.

The season's activity was reflected with an accumulated cyclone energy (ACE) rating of 61, slightly above the 1911–1920 average of 58.7. ACE is a metric used to express the energy used by a tropical cyclone during its lifetime. Therefore, a storm with a longer duration will have high values of ACE. It is only calculated at six-hour increments in which specific tropical and subtropical systems are either at or above sustained wind speeds of 39 mph (63 km/h), which is the threshold for tropical storm intensity. Thus, tropical depressions are not included here.

== Systems ==
=== Tropical Storm One ===
- Tropical storm (SSHWS)
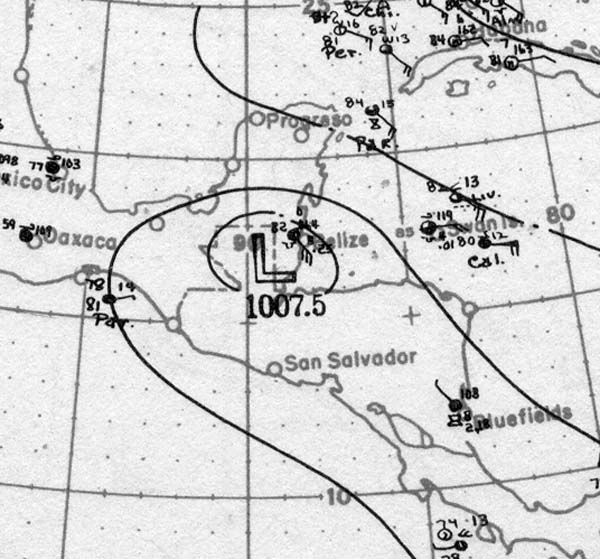
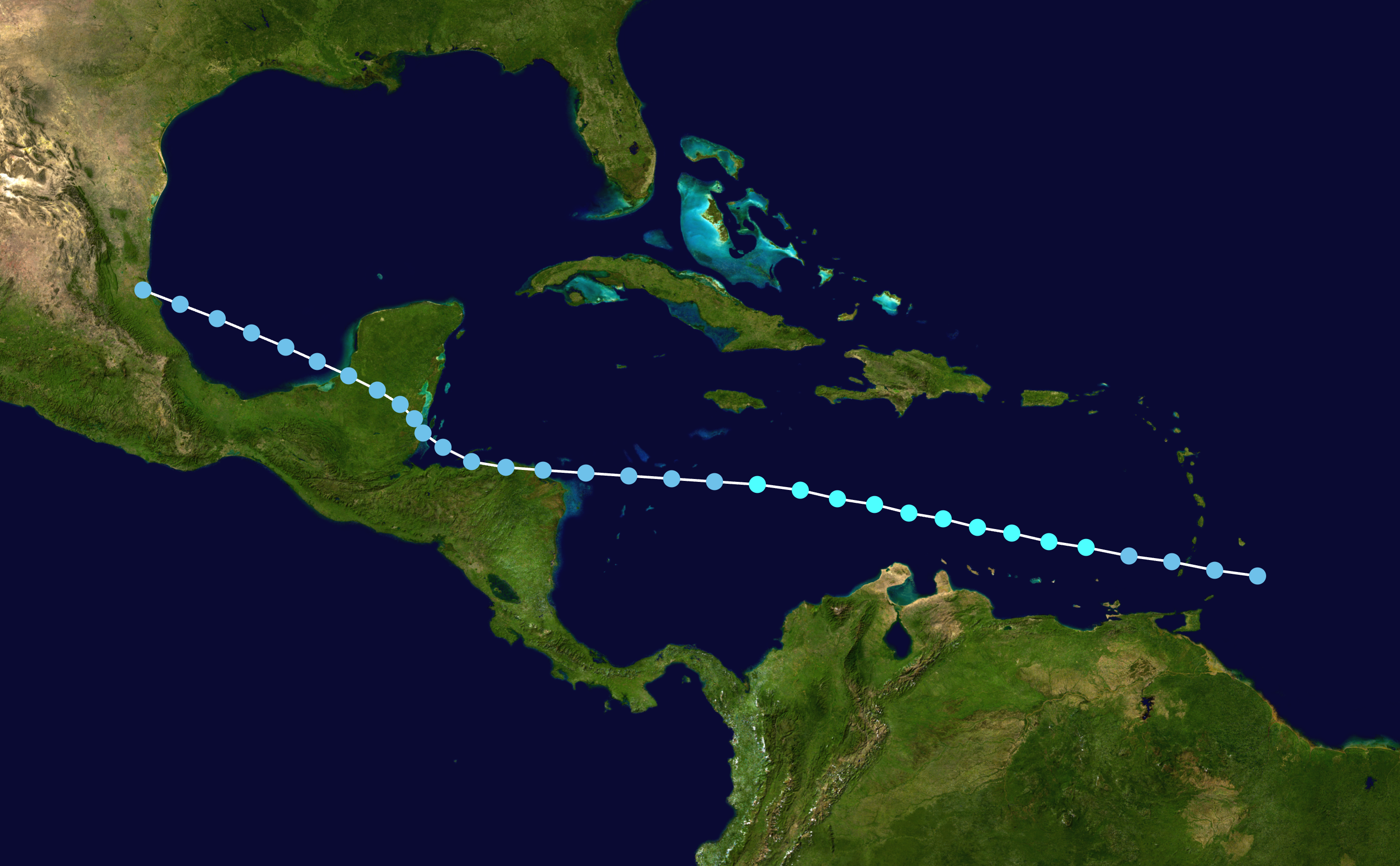
- Duration: July 6 – July 14
- Peak intensity: 50 mph (85 km/h) (1-min); <1006 mbar (hPa)

Historical weather maps indicated a trough east of the Windward Islands on July 6. Around 06:00 UTC, a tropical depression formed about 80 mi (130 km) southeast of Barbados. Moving west-northwestward, the depression crossed the Windward Islands and entered the Caribbean Sea early on July 7. Later that day, the system intensified into a tropical storm. After peaking with winds of 50 mph (85 km/h) on July 8, it began to weaken and fell to tropical depression intensity early on July 10. Early the next day, the depression struck Honduras, before briefly emerging into the Caribbean Sea. The system struck Belize around 06:00 UTC on July 12 and entered the Bay of Campeche about 24 hours later. At midday on July 14, the storm struck south of Tampico, Tamaulipas. In the city of Veracruz, 4 in (100 mm) of rain fell in a 24-hour period.

=== Tropical Storm Two ===
- Tropical storm (SSHWS)
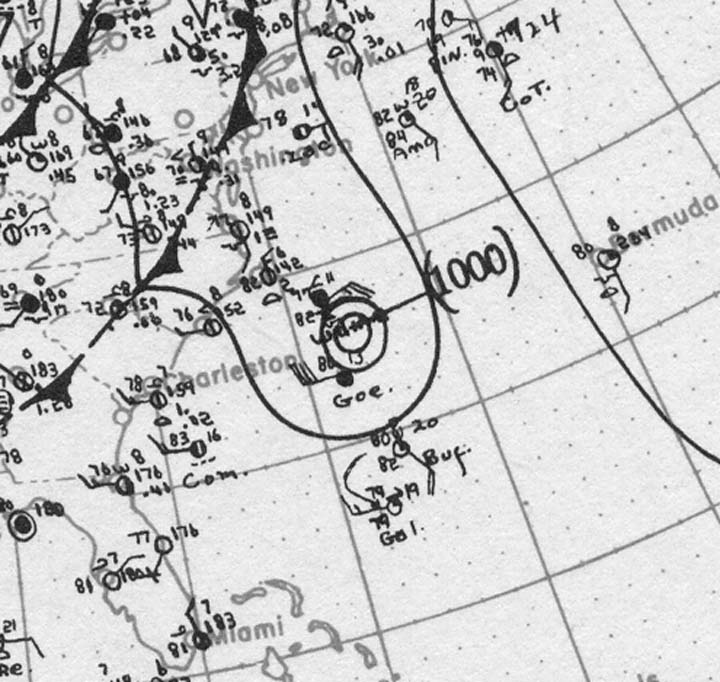
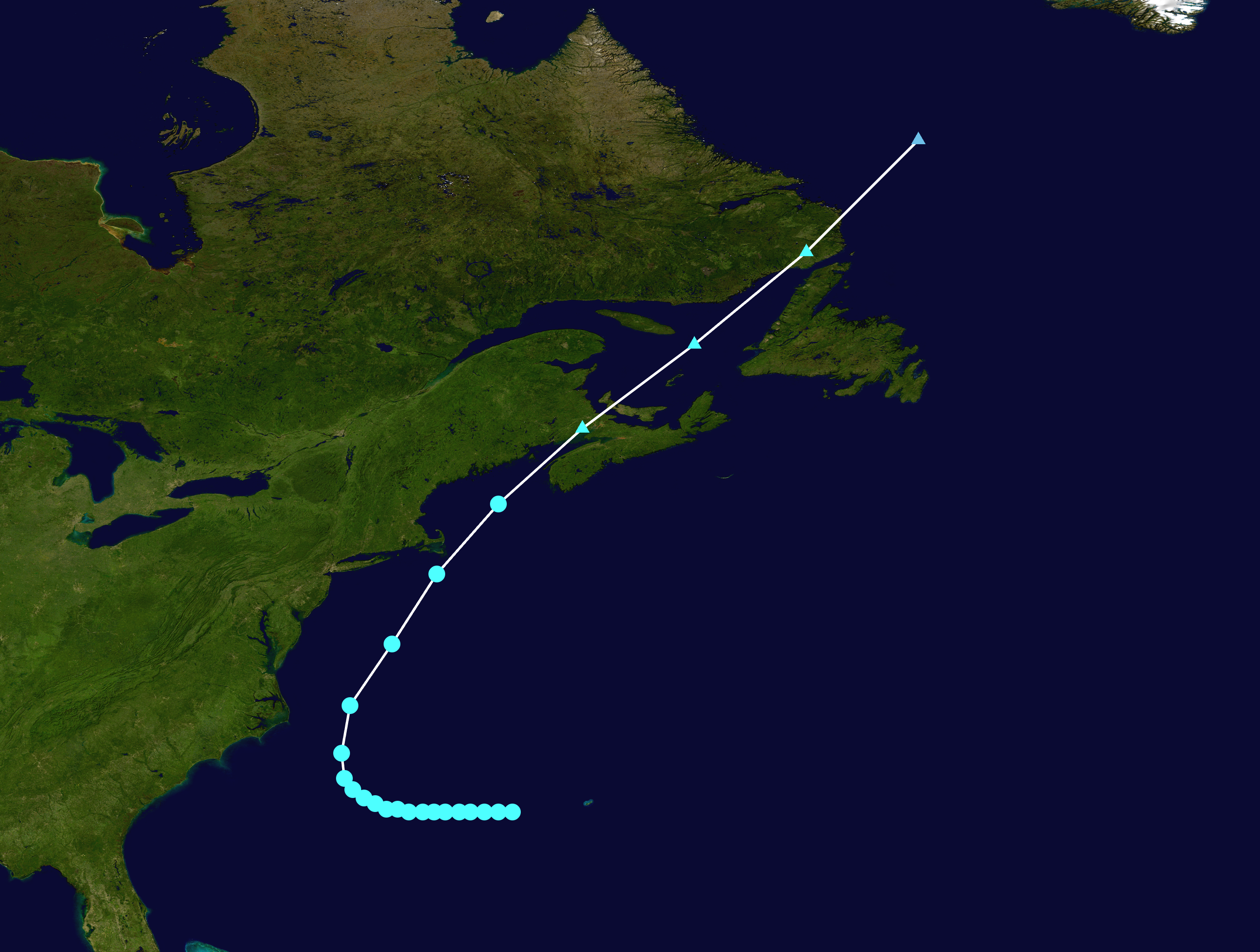
- Duration: August 6 – August 10
- Peak intensity: 70 mph (110 km/h) (1-min); <994 mbar (hPa)

An area of low pressure developed into a tropical storm to the west of Bermuda at 00:00 UTC on August 6. Initially the storm drifted westward and strengthened minimally. By August 9, it curved northward and began to accelerate. The storm strengthened further and attained its peak intensity with maximum sustained winds of 70 mph (110 km/h) and a minimum barometric pressure of 994 mbar (29.4 inHg) early on August 10; both were observations from the Nantucket Shoals Lightship. Offshore the island of Nantucket in Massachusetts, four ships were lost, with an estimated 41 people perishing. The storm continued northeastward and made landfall in Saint John County, New Brunswick while becoming extratropical at 00:00 UTC on August 11. The remnants dissipated over the Labrador Sea later that day. In Nova Scotia, dozens of boats were beached. Wind speeds up to 64 mph (103 km/h) in Yarmouth damaged trees, power lines, windows, and roofs. Crops were impacted throughout the Annapolis Valley. Fifteen barns were damaged or demolished.

=== Hurricane Three ===
- Category 3 hurricane (SSHWS)
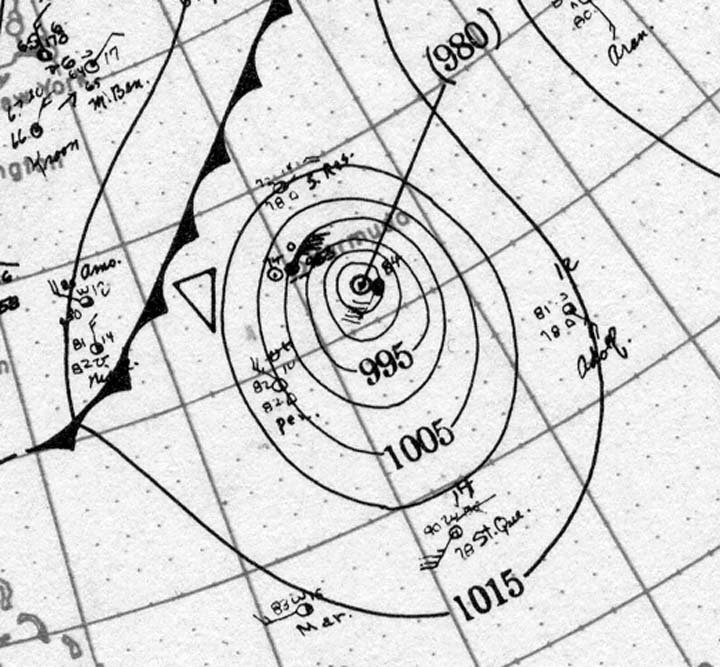
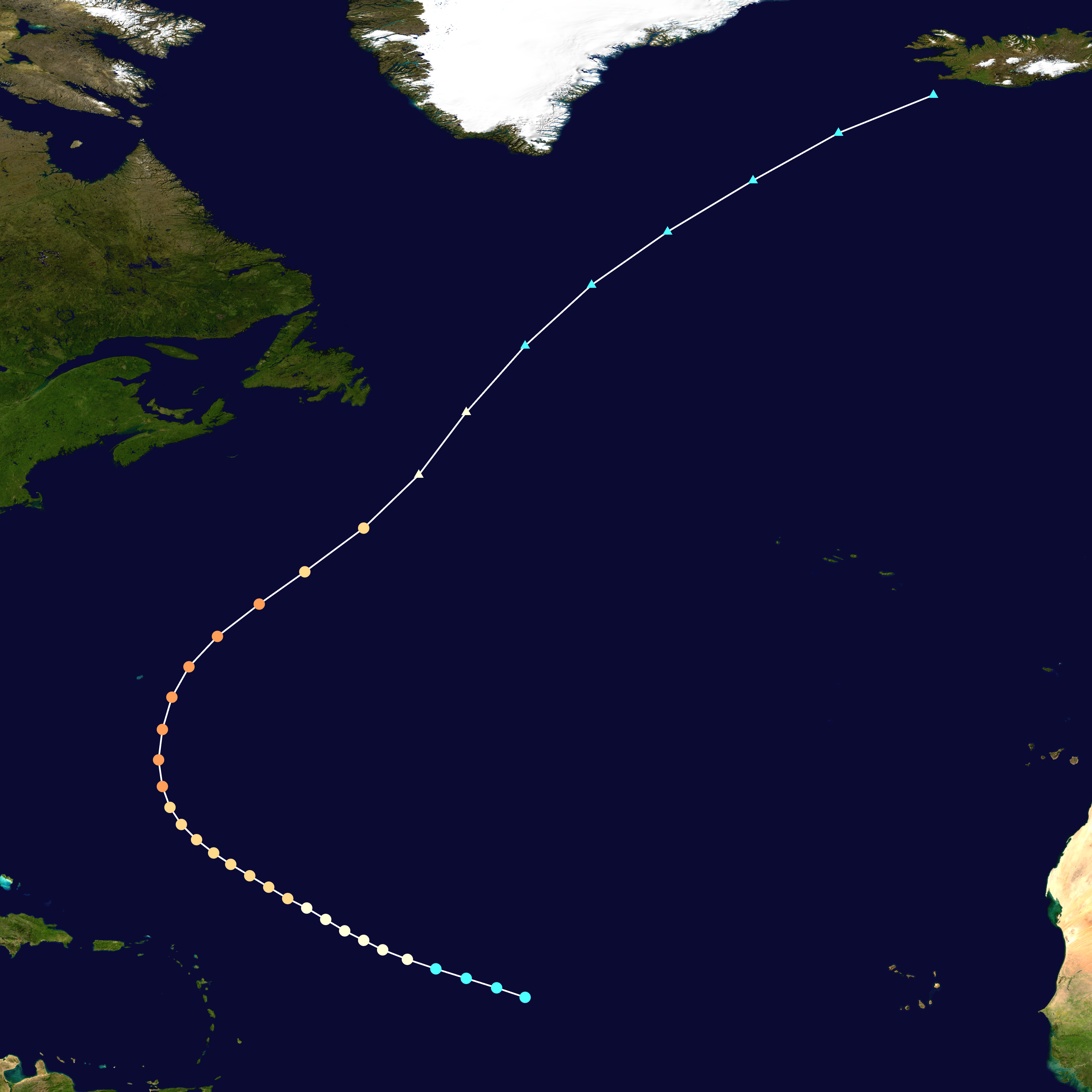
- Duration: August 30 – September 5
- Peak intensity: 120 mph (195 km/h) (1-min); <980 mbar (hPa)

Weather maps indicated that an area of low pressure existed between the Lesser Antilles and Cape Verde on August 30. At 12:00 UTC that day, a tropical storm developed while located about 900 mi (1,400 km) northeast of Cayenne, French Guiana. Moving west-northwestward, the tropical storm reached Category 1 hurricane intensity early on August 31. By late on September 1, the storm had intensified into a Category 2 hurricane. Further strengthening occurred brought the hurricane to a Category 3 intensity late on September 3, while briefly heading northward. Early the next day, the cyclone attained its peak force with winds of 120 mph (195 km/h); the lowest barometric pressure reading in association with the storm was 980 mbar (29 inHg).

While passing east of Bermuda late on September 4, the storm's "unprecedented high tides" lashed the island. Portions of Market Square on St. David's Island were submerged. Additionally, a large section of Higgs' Island was completely washed away. The storm accelerated to the northeast and weakened to a Category 2 hurricane around 12:00 UTC on September 5. Losing tropical characteristics, the hurricane transitioned into an extratropical cyclone at 00:00 UTC the following day, while located about 290 mi (470 km) southeast of Cape Race, Newfoundland. Its remnants tracked northeastward until dissipating near Iceland on September 7.

=== Hurricane Four ===
- Category 4 hurricane (SSHWS)
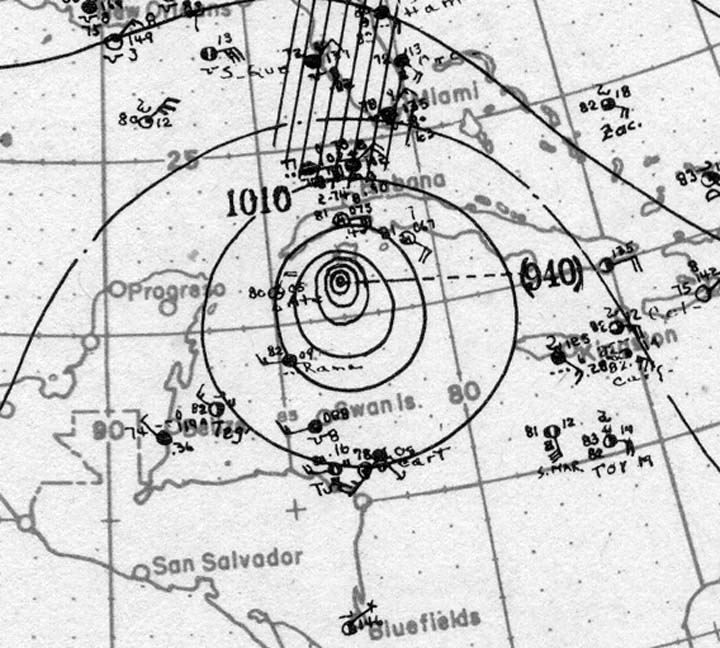
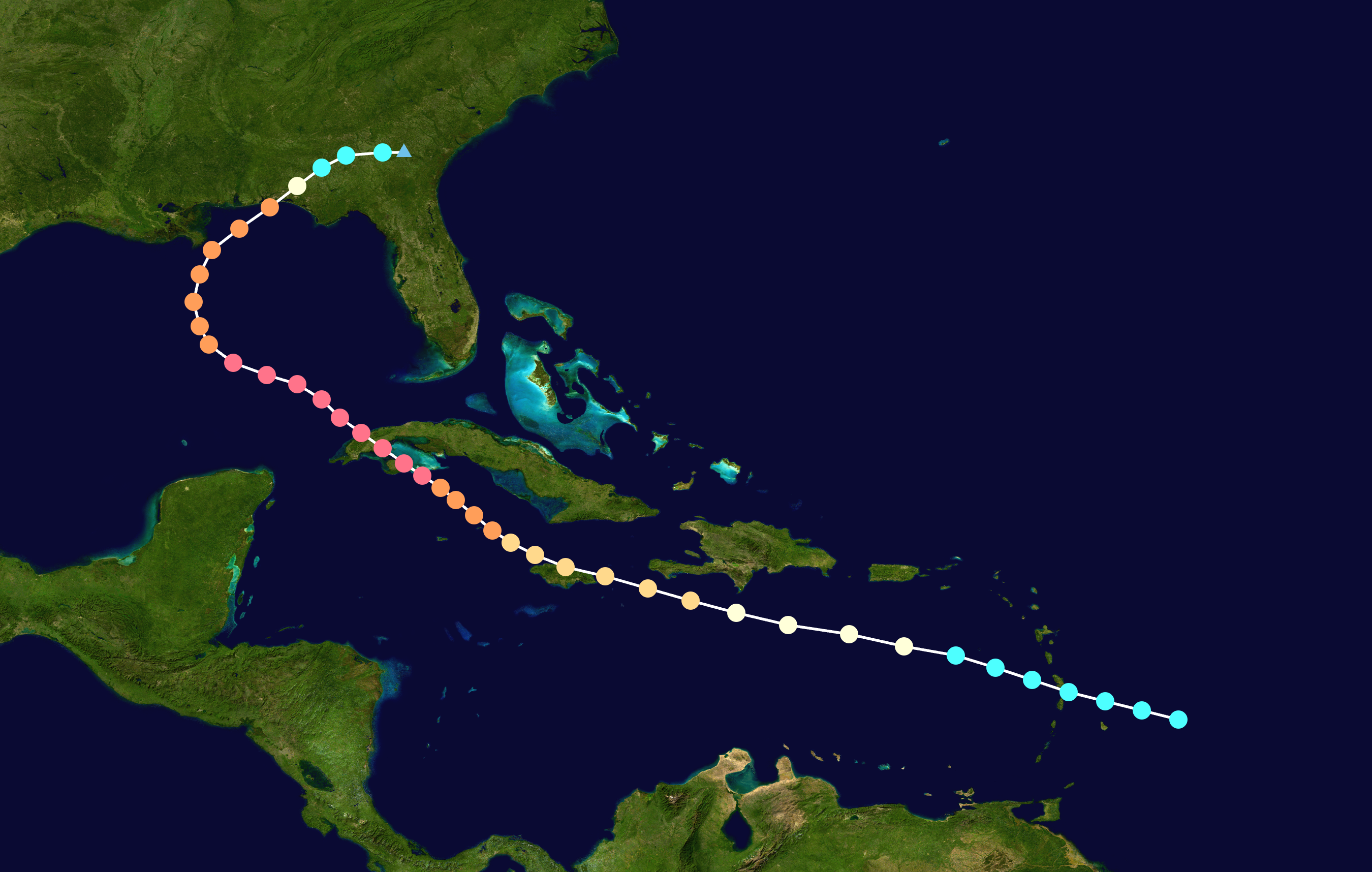
- Duration: September 20 – September 30
- Peak intensity: 150 mph (240 km/h) (1-min); 928 mbar (hPa)

The Nueva Gerona Hurricane of 1917

A tropical storm formed about 160 mi (260 km) east-northeast of Barbados on September 20. Later that day, the storm crossed the Lesser Antilles between the islands of Saint Lucia and Martinique. Upon entering the Caribbean Sea on September 21, the system intensified quicker, becoming a Category 1 hurricane several hours later. While passing south of the Tiburon Peninsula on the following day, the storm strengthened into a Category 2 hurricane. Later on September 23, the hurricane struck the northern coast of Jamaica, before re-emerging into the Caribbean Sea. Around 06:00 UTC on September 24, it intensified into a Category 3 hurricane. Approximately 24 hours later, the hurricane deepened into a Category 4 hurricane.

Ramón Perez of the Instituto de Meteorología de la República de Cuba estimated that this hurricane attained a minimum barometric pressure of 928 mbar (27.4 inHg) on September 25. Using the pressure-wind relationship, HURDAT increased the maximum sustained wind speed to 150 mph (240 km/h). Within the next six hours, the hurricane made landfall in the eastern Pinar del Río Province of Cuba. The system entered the Gulf of Mexico later on September 25. While moving northwestward, the storm fell to Category 3 hurricane intensity early on September 27. It briefly tracked generally northward and approached southeastern Louisiana before re-curving northeastward late the next day. At 02:00 UTC on September 29, the hurricane made landfall near Camp Walton, Florida with winds of 115 mph (185 km/h). Shortly thereafter, the system rapidly weakened to a Category 1 hurricane and fell to a tropical storm several hours later. Early on September 30, it became extratropical over Georgia. About six hours later, the remnants of the hurricane dissipated.

Some islands in the Lesser Antilles experienced strong winds and heavy rainfall, including Dominica, Guadeloupe, and Saint Lucia. Rough seas on Martinique capsized eight barges and beached a yacht. The cyclone uprooted trees and damaged roads and homes on Montserrat, leading to one death when a dwelling collapsed on a child. In Jamaica, the hurricane caused significant damages to banana and coconut plantations. Communications from Holland Bay were disrupted when the station was demolished. The greatest damages were reported from the northern half of the island. Nine people died at Port Antonio, where the hurricane destroyed the custom house and severely damaged a hotel. On Cuba's Isla de la Juventud, strong winds destroyed well-constructed buildings in Nueva Gerona, devastating the town. At least 20 deaths and $2 million in damage occurred on Isla de la Juventud. Orchards and crops were destroyed on the Pinar del Río Province. In Louisiana and Mississippi, impact was generally limited to damaged crops and timber stands. Ten people drowned in the former, nine as a result of the wrecking of the fishing bark Wanna. Farther east in Mobile, Alabama, portions of roofs, trees, and other debris littered streets. Communications were severed in Pensacola, Florida. Several small watercraft washed ashore, and numerous wharves, docks, and boat storages suffered impact. Total damages were estimated near $170,000 in Pensacola area. Five deaths were reported in Florida, all of them in the city of Crestview.

=== Tropical depressions ===
In addition to the four systems reaching tropical storm intensity, there were five other tropical depressions. The first probably developed from a tropical wave offshore western Africa on September 12, according to historical weather maps and the Comprehensive Ocean-Atmosphere Data Set (COADS), both of which indicated a closed circulation. This depression was last observed on September 14. Another depression also developed on September 12, well to the east of the Lesser Antilles. While approaching the islands, the storm may have briefly strengthened into a tropical storm on September 15, as suggested by a ship report of winds blowing 40 mph (65 km/h). The cyclone likely dissipated on September 15.

The next tropical depression briefly existed off the east coast of Florida on September 14. It soon became extratropical, though its remnants lasted several days, traveling along the East Coast of the United States. At Nantucket, a wind gust up to 69 mph (111 km/h) was observed. The extratropical remnants probably dissipated near Newfoundland on September 20. Meanwhile, a trough in the Gulf of Mexico had developed into a tropical depression on September 14. The following day, the system made landfall in Louisiana and disintegrated into a disorganized area of thunderstorms over Mississippi and Arkansas on September 16. The last tropical depression and final cyclone of the season developed on October 19 from a trough over the central Atlantic Ocean. Two days later, the depression was absorbed by a cold front.

== See also ==
- 1900–1940 South Pacific cyclone seasons
- 1900–1950 South-West Indian Ocean cyclone seasons
- 1910s Australian region cyclone seasons
