= 1910s North Indian Ocean cyclone seasons =

The following is a list of North Indian Ocean tropical cyclones from 1910 to 1919. Records from before the 1970s were extremely unreliable, and storms that stayed at sea were often only reported by ship reports.

== 1910 ==
- April 13–16, 1910 – An intense tropical existed over Andaman Sea.
- April 1911 - A cyclonic storm struck Teknaf in Bangladesh (then British India), causing 120,000 deaths.
- May 1917 - A cyclonic storm struck the Sundarbans in Bangladesh (then British India)), causing 70,000 deaths.
- October 19–26, 1917 - A cyclonic storm made landfall in Gujarat, India (then British India) between Veraval and Dwarka.
- September 1919 - A cyclonic storm struck Barisal in Bangladesh (then British India), causing 40,000 deaths.

== See also ==
- 1910s Australian region cyclone seasons
- 1900–1940 South Pacific cyclone seasons
- 1900–1950 South-West Indian Ocean cyclone seasons
- Atlantic hurricane seasons: 1910, 1911, 1912, 1913, 1914, 1915, 1916, 1917, 1918, 1919
- Eastern Pacific hurricane seasons: 1910, 1911, 1912, 1913, 1914, 1915, 1916, 1917, 1918, 1919
- Western Pacific typhoon seasons: 1910, 1911, 1912, 1913, 1914, 1915, 1916, 1917, 1918, 1919
