= 1912 Tacloban typhoon =

Pacific typhoon in 1912

Aftermath

The 1912 Tacloban typhoon was a typhoon that struck Tacloban, Philippines in 1912. It has been pointed out that this typhoon was very similar to Typhoon Haiyan in November 2013 (about 100 years later).

== Overview ==
On October 15, 1912, a typhoon swept through the central Philippines and "practically destroyed" Tacloban. In Tacloban and Capiz on the island of Panay, the death toll was 15,000, half the population of those communities at the time.

Tacloban was devastated by Super Typhoon Haiyan in 2013, 101 years later. In other words, a similar catastrophe occurred about a century after the 1912 typhoon. However, there was no report that the lessons of the 1912 typhoon were passed down. In other words, despite the devastating damage caused by the 1912 typhoon, it was largely forgotten 101 years later. So when Typhoon Haiyan hit Tacloban, the interesting fact that a similar catastrophe had occurred about 100 years ago was revealed once again. Due to this, 2013 Haiyan was also called "100-Year Storm".

== See also ==
- Typhoon Haiyan (2013)
