= SS Kiche Maru =

Japanese steamship

The SS Kiche Maru was a Japanese steamship that sank during a typhoon on 22 September 1912.

Although more than 1,000 died, the disaster has long been overshadowed by the earlier loss (on 15 April 1912) of the RMS Titanic, and by the fact that Kiche Maru was one of hundreds of naval calamities caused by a tropical storm in Southern Japan. The sinking of the ship was swiftly reported, though confusion about its name became apparent (it was referred to as the Kieko Maru, the Keiko Maru, and the Kickermaru in later accounts). Kiche Maru, a passenger ship, foundered off the island of Honshū, with the loss of all souls aboard.

Although the sinking of the Japanese passenger ship was reported in the Western press as part of the news of the 1912 typhoon, and the information has been repeated in English-language lists of historic disasters, no contemporaneous Japanese accounts have been found to describe either the shipwreck, or the ship itself.
