= 1910s Pacific hurricane seasons =

The 1910s Pacific hurricane seasons all began on May 15 of their respective years in the eastern north Pacific Ocean and on June 1 in the central north Pacific. They ended on November 30 of each year. These dates conventionally delimit the time of year when most tropical cyclones form in northeast Pacific Ocean tropical cyclone basin, between the International Date Line and the west coast of North America. However, tropical cyclone formation is possible at any time of the year. Before the dawn of the satellite era in the 1960s, data on Pacific hurricanes is extremely unreliable. For a few years, there are no reported cyclones, although many systems likely formed and went undocumented.

== 1910 ==
Three known tropical cyclones formed in 1910. The remnants of one of them entered southern California on September 15, bringing 2 inches (51 mm) of rain to Santa Barbara County.

== 1911 ==
Eleven known tropical cyclones formed in 1911 in the eastern Pacific proper.

On September 11, Hurricane 4 of this year's Atlantic season survived passage over Central America and emerged into the Pacific Ocean, where it dissipated on September 12.

On September 29, a ship reported strong winds and a pressure of 998 mbar inside a storm to the east of Hawaii. There were no other reports of this possible tropical cyclone.

A "tropical hurricane" formed southwest of Mexico on October 1. The system recurved, coming ashore on October 4 near Guaymas, accompanied by a devastating storm surge early on the morning of October 5, with some 500 reported dead. It then crossed through western Mexico, before becoming an extratropical cyclone across the American southwest on October 5. The cyclone had a long life thereafter, moving east-northeast across the United States into the western Atlantic on October 7. Racing northeast, the cyclone moved over the Polar ice cap on October 11, arcing north of Europe, before dropping into northern Asia on October 13, then crossing through Siberia until October 21, when the low dissipated.

A "tropical hurricane" formed south of Mexico on October 6. The system moved north-northwest, making landfall west of Acapulco on October 8, before dissipating inland on October 10.

== 1912 ==
Four known tropical cyclones formed in 1912.

One of them, which stayed at sea, was tracked from August 10 to 11 of this year.

A "tropical hurricane" formed southwest of Mexico on October 23. The cyclone moved northwest, then northward, through western Mexico on October 26 before dissipating on October 27.

== 1913 ==
There was only one known tropical cyclone in 1913.

== 1914 ==
There were no known tropical cyclones.

== 1915 ==
Four tropical cyclones formed in 1915.

On July 4, a system formed WNW of Cocos Island. It made landfall near Salina Cruz two days later.

A tropical cyclone hit northern Baja California in late August. Its remnants entered California on August 26, bringing light rains amounting to 1-inch (25 mm).

A "tropical hurricane" moved just offshore the coasts of southern and western Mexico between September 3 and 7.

== 1916 ==
There were no known tropical cyclones.

== 1917 ==
Four tropical cyclones formed in 1917.

A "tropical hurricane" formed southwest of Mexico on August 29, moved northward into western Mexico on September 1.

== 1918 ==
Three tropical cyclones formed in the eastern Pacific in 1918.

On September 13, a hurricane was discovered off the coast of Acapulco. It paralleled the coast and moved slightly inland. After reentering the Pacific Ocean, it made landfall in the Gulf of California side of the Baja California Peninsula. This hurricane's remnants continued north into California. This system was destructive. Several people in San José del Cabo were killed, and several houses and buildings were destroyed. In La Paz, every ship was either sunk, run aground, or damaged. Several vessels at sea were also sunk. This system's remnants produced light rains in Southern California. When they reached Northern California on September 17, they caused heavy precipitation amounting to 7 inches (180 mm). A total of twenty-five deaths were reported, mainly from drowning or falling trees. Damage was at least 200,000 pesos.

On September 29, a "tropical hurricane" moved by Johnston Island to the north-northeast, converting into an extratropical cyclone by October 1. The system raced east-northeast, moving through the Alaskan panhandle into western Canada on October 5. The cyclone then moved westward across Canada until October 10, when it dissipated.

== 1919 ==
There were two known tropical cyclones.

== See also ==
- Pacific hurricane season
- 1900–1940 South Pacific cyclone seasons
- 1900–1950 South-West Indian Ocean cyclone seasons
- 1910s Australian region cyclone seasons
