= 1939 Pacific typhoon season =

Seasonal boundaries
- First system formed: February 3, 1939
- Last system dissipated: December 26, 1939

Strongest storm
- Name: Twenty-Six
  - Lowest pressure: 952 hPa (mbar)

Seasonal statistics
- Total depressions: 28
- Total storms: 24
- Typhoons: 22
- Total fatalities: 151 direct, 12 missing
- Total damage: Unknown

Related articles
- 1939 Atlantic hurricane season; 1939 Pacific hurricane season; 1930s North Indian Ocean cyclone seasons

The 1939 Pacific typhoon season has no official bounds; it ran year-round in 1939, but most tropical cyclones tend to form in the northwestern Pacific Ocean between May and November. These dates conventionally delimit the period of each year when most tropical cyclones form in the northwestern Pacific Ocean.

The scope of this article is limited to the Pacific Ocean, north of the equator and west of the International Date Line. Storms that form east of the date line and north of the equator are called hurricanes; see 1939 Pacific hurricane season. Storms in the season were tracked by the United States Weather Bureau and released in the Monthly Weather Review under the header "Typhoons and Depressions over the Far East". The Monthly Weather Review only covers tropical cyclones west of 150° E. Due to lack of satellites and ship reports due to the Pacific Theatre of World War II, it is possible other tropical cyclones existed, especially if they were short-lived or of minor intensity.

There were 29 known tropical cyclones, including 24 of typhoon status, of which several of the storms were deadly. A typhoon in November was the deadliest cyclone of the season, causing 49 deaths as it crossed the Philippines. The same typhoon later struck Hong Kong, where the Hong Kong Observatory recorded the first period of calm during the eye of a cyclone. At least 151 people were killed during the season, with 12 missing and unconfirmed of their status during some point during the season.

== Systems ==
=== February–May ===
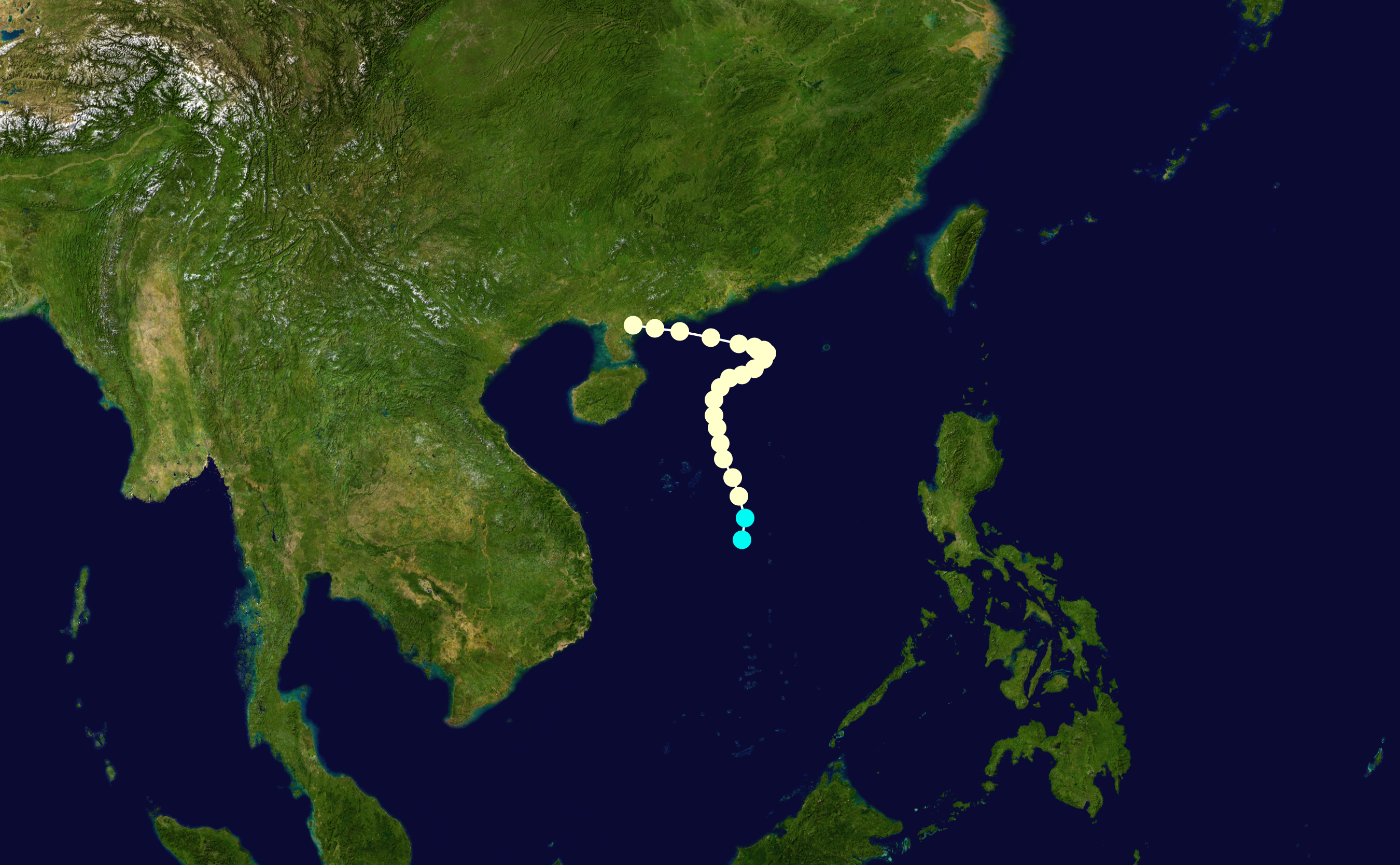
Track map of the third typhoon

A depression was first observed on February 3 while located about 250 miles (400 km) of Yap. It tracked steadily westward until February 7 when it stalled about 200 miles (320 km) east of the Philippine island of Mindanao. The depression remained nearly stationary for two days until turning to a steady northwest motion. It approached the island of Samar Island on February 12, where a pressure of 1,006.0 hectopascals (29.71 inHg) was reported, and subsequently turned to the north and later to the northeast. The depression was last observed on February 16 accelerating towards the Aleutian Islands. The system produced heavy rainfall in the Philippines, with extensive flooding reported in Surigao del Norte.

On April 29, an area of low pressure was located about 300 miles (480 km) south of Yap. It moved westward, northward, and ultimately to the west-northwest before developing into a tropical depression on May 2 to the east of the Philippines. Early on May 3, after intensifying into a tropical storm the system struck Samar Island, and the next day it hit Masbate before turning northward. After passing over northern Luzon on May 5, the storm accelerated northeastward as it moved through the Luzon Strait, and intensified into a typhoon on May 7. While the typhoon was off the southern coast of Japan, a ship located 290 miles (470 km) south of Nagoya reported a minimum central pressure of 986.0 hectopascals (29.12 inHg). The typhoon weakened as it paralleled about 100 miles (160 km) off the coast of Japan, and was last observed on May 9 accelerating northeastward. The storm produced strong winds throughout the eastern portions of the Philippine archipelago. 90 fishermen were caught in the storm, with one person drowning and eleven missing at one estimate made one month after the storm passed the area. Winds reached tropical storm force in southern Japan.

A tropical depression developed on May 26 in the northern portion of the South China Sea. After initially moving to the northwest, the depression later turned to the northeast and quickly intensified to attain typhoon status by May 28 while located to the east of Hainan Island. The typhoon stalled on May 30 before turning to the west, and moved inland on southern China on May 31. Several ships reported strong winds, rough seas, and heavy rainfall in conjunction with the storm, with one ship reporting a minimum central pressure of 994.0 hectopascals (29.35 inHg). On land, a station in Hong Kong recorded a pressure of about 1,000.0 hectopascals (29.53 inHg) as well as minor winds.

=== July ===
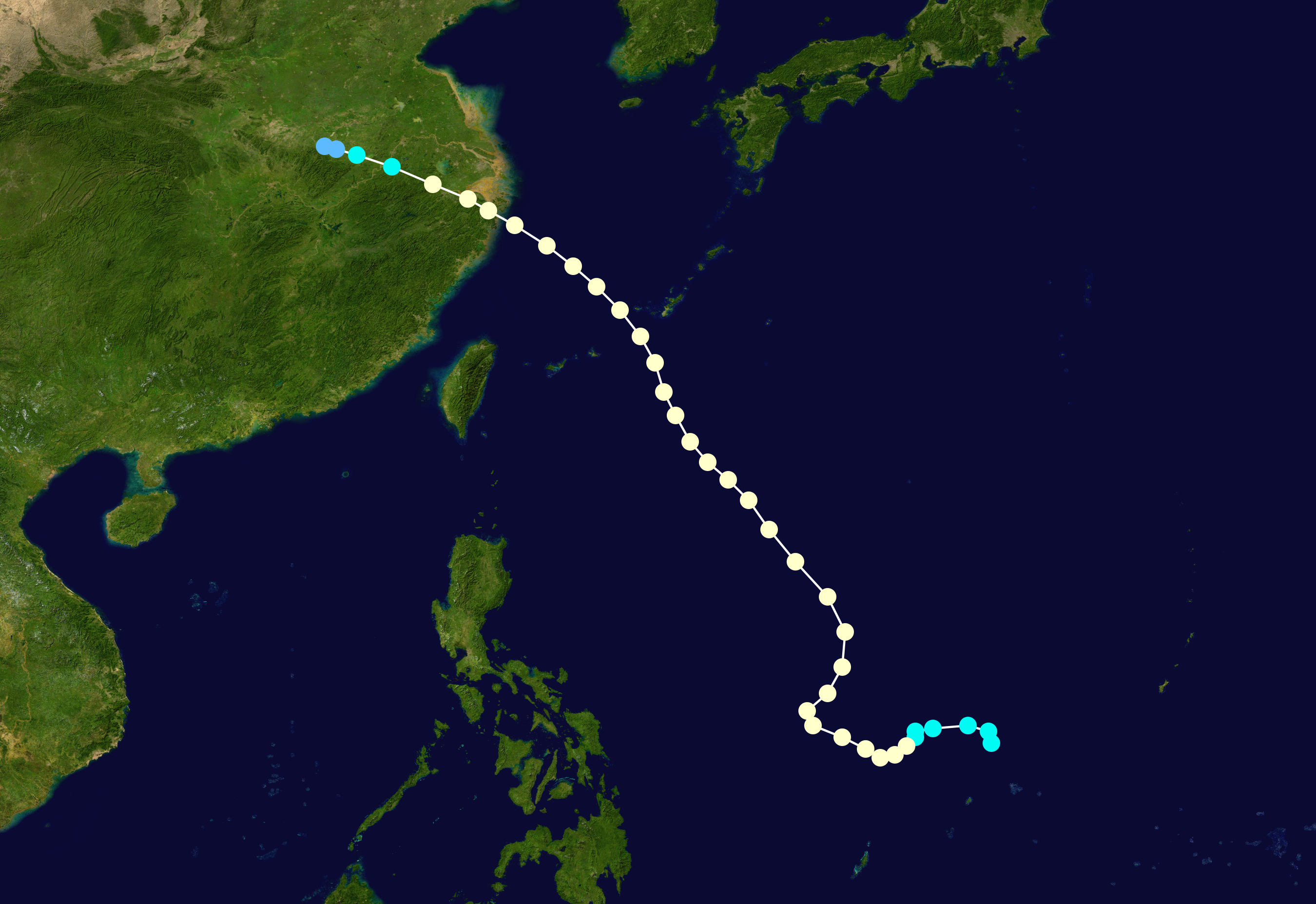
Track map of the 2nd typhoon in July, which struck China

On July 7, a tropical depression was first observed while located about 400 miles (640 km) east of Naha, Okinawa. It moved to the northwest, and the next day a station in Ōshima reported winds in excess of 65 mph (105 km/h) and a pressure of 978.0 hectopascals (28.88 inHg) when the storm was nearby. Based on the report, it is estimated it intensified into a typhoon, and after turning northeastward upon entering the Yellow Sea it struck North Korea. The storm turned to the east, and was last observed on July 12 in the open Pacific Ocean. Rainfall and flooding from the typhoon and several other storms during the month resulted in two deaths and considerable damage to private and public property in the Philippines.

A tropical depression developed roughly 250 miles (400 km) of the eastern Philippines on July 7. The depression tracked northwestward initially, and after intensifying into a typhoon its motion turned to the north-northeast, followed by a turn back to the northwest on July 10. The typhoon crossed the East China Sea and made landfall on eastern China near Shanghai on July 12, where 80-mph (130-km/h) winds and a pressure of 992.0 hectopascals (29.29 inHg) were recorded. The storm weakened as it continued its motion while roughly paralleling the northern coastline, and dissipated on July 13. The passage of the typhoon killed at least six people in Shanghai.

A typhoon quickly developed about 120 miles (190 km) west of northern Luzon on July 10. It initially moved northwestward, then a day later turned to the northeast. After passing through the Luzon Strait, the typhoon changed its motion to the northwest, resulting in a landfall on northern Taiwan. The typhoon struck southeastern China, and dissipated about 500 miles (800 km) inland on July 17. A ship en route to Hong Kong reported a pressure of 997.0 hectopascals (29.44 inHg) and winds of over 40 mph (64 km/h). A station on western Luzon recorded minor winds and slightly below normal pressures in association with the system.

On July 22, a low pressure area formed into a tropical depression while located about halfway between the Philippines and the Marianas Islands. The depression steadily intensified as it tracked to the northwest, and attained typhoon status on July 18. After a brief turn to the north-northeast, the storm changed its motion to the northwest, and made landfall on southeastern Taiwan and later on China on July 20 about 120 miles (190 km) south of Shanghai. It quickly dissipated. A station in the Ryūkyū Islands reported a pressure of 997.0 hectopascals (29.44 inHg) with light winds.

A tropical depression formed on July 20 while located between the Philippines and the Marianas Islands. After moving steadily northwestward, the system stalled for two days, and later turned to the north-northeast. The storm intensified into a typhoon shortly before crossing the Ryūkyū Islands, after which it turned sharply westward. Unfavorable conditions encountered the storm, and it rapidly dissipated over the open waters of the East China Sea on July 27. A station in Naha, Okinawa recorded a pressure of 999.0 hectopascals (29.50 inHg), with another station in the Ryūkyū Islands reporting winds of around 20 mph (32 km/h).

A well-developed typhoon was first observed on July 22 moving rapidly northward about 700 miles (1,100 km) east of Taiwan. The typhoon turned to the northwest, passing just south of the Japanese island of Kyūshū. It turned to the west, crossing the Yellow Sea and striking the Chinese province of Shandong before dissipating on July 25. A station in the Ryūkyū Islands recorded a pressure of 997.0 hectopascals (29.44 inHg), with a station on Borodino Island reporting winds of about 15 mph (24 km/h).

On July 22, a small typhoon developed a short distance off the coast of Taiwan. It drifted northwestward, then turned to the northeast, and by July 24 unfavorable conditions caused it to dissipate. A ship sailing between Hong Kong and Shanghai, China reported a pressure of 995.0 hectopascals (29.38 inHg) and winds of around 35 mph (56 km/h).

An area of low pressure organized into a tropical depression on July 25 over the open waters of the western Pacific Ocean. The depression tracked northwestward, and gradually strengthened to attain typhoon status on July 27. After turning to the west, it gradually recurved towards the north and approached northern Taiwan. Under varying steering currents, the typhoon executed a counterclockwise loop over the country, and exited from the southern coastline after turning eastward. By the morning of August 1, it was located about 250 miles (400 km) east of Taiwan, after which the typhoon accelerated to the northeast. After reaching the Ryūkyū Islands on August 3, the storm stalled, turned to the northwest for a day, then weakened until dissipating on August 6 to the south of Japan after turning to the east. A station in the Philippines reported a pressure of 996.0 hectopascals (29.41 inHg) in association with the storm, with another station recording winds of 68 mph (109 km/h).

On July 28, a low pressure area formed into a tropical depression over the Marianas Islands. It tracked to the northwest, and quickly intensified into a typhoon a few hours after developing while located about 250 miles (400 km) south of the Ogasawara Islands. After changing its motion to the west, the typhoon turned sharply northward on July 31, followed by a turn to the east-northeast. The storm passed through the Ogasawara Islands on August 2, and halted its forward motion before turning to the northwest. On August 6 the typhoon struck south-central Japan and later the island of Hokkaidō after turning to the northeast, and it was last observed on August 8 in the open western Pacific Ocean. A ship passing through the center of the typhoon recorded a pressure of 960.0 hectopascals (28.35 inHg) and winds exceeding 55 mph (89 km/h).

=== August ===
From August 1–3, a tropical cyclone existed near the Ryukyu Islands.

=== September ===
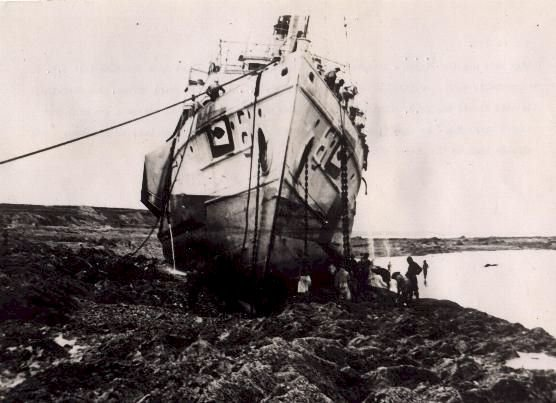
USS Pigeon grounded on China from September typhoon

A tropical depression formed on September 12 about 300 miles (480 km) south of Guam. It moved northwestward without strengthening, and dissipated on September 16 about 600 miles (970 km) east of the Philippines. The depression never affected land.

On September 17 a tropical depression developed in the South China Sea. It tracked westward, and intensified into a typhoon. On September 19, the storm made landfall on Vietnam about 150 miles (240 km) northwest of Da Nang, and subsequently dissipated. Meteorological details for the typhoon are unavailable due to the presence of the Pacific Theatre of World War II.

An area of disturbed weather organized into a tropical depression on September 18 about 250 miles (400 km) west of Guam. The depression slowly intensified as it moved generally northwestward, and by September 21 it attained typhoon status while located about east of Aparri on Luzon. Shortly after strengthening into a typhoon, the storm turned to the northeast and paralleled the southern coastline of Japan a short distance offshore. It was last observed on September 24.

Atmospheric pressure was relatively low over the South China Sea during the last week of September, and subsequent to the development of a circulation in an area of disturbed weather, a tropical depression formed on September 27. It quickly strengthened to typhoon status, and made landfall on eastern Vietnam just south of Da Nang on September 30. The storm quickly weakened over land, with only slight traces of the former typhoon by the following day. A station in the northern Philippines recorded a pressure of 1,000.0 hectopascals (29.53 inHg), and a recording station near the location of its final landfall reported winds of about 50 mph (80 km/h).

=== October ===
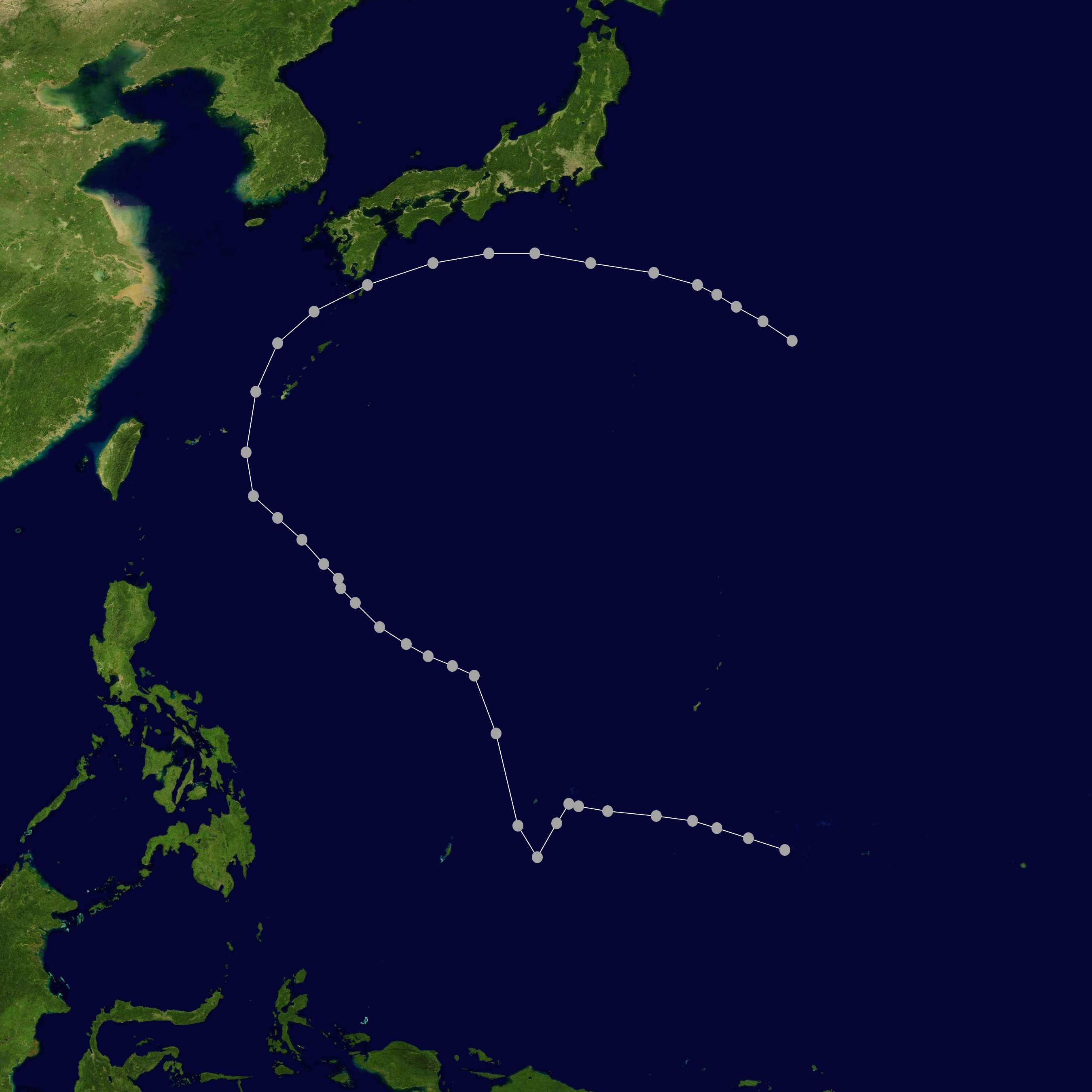
Track map of a typhoon that struck Japan

On October 3 a tropical depression developed about 500 miles (800 km) south-southeast of Guam, likely having originated from a tropical disturbance in the eastern Caroline Islands. The system gradually strengthened to typhoon status while it tracked west-northwestward. On October 7 the typhoon turned to the northwest and moved through the southern Luzon Strait, passing about 30 miles (48 km) southwest of Basco in the Batanes on October 9. Under unfavorable conditions the typhoon steadily weakened over the subsequent days, and dissipated on October 12 over the southern portion of the Taiwan Strait. The minimum pressure associated with the typhoon was a value of 957.0 hectopascals (28.26 inHg) at Basco, where winds exceeding 75 mph (121 km/h) were also recorded. Damage was minor over northern Luzon.

A tropical depression was first observed on October 7 to the east-northeast of Guam. Tracking to the northwest, the depression steadily intensified to attain typhoon status. Several days later, it began to weaken while gradually recurving to the northeast, and on October 13 it became extratropical. A ship on its way to the Philippines recorded a pressure of 995.0 hectopascals (29.38 inHg) along with winds of about 50 mph (80 km/h).

On October 10 a tropical depression was first observed about 300 miles (480 km) south of Guam. It initially moved west-northwestward, and strengthened into a typhoon on October 11 while briefly changing its motion to the southwest. The next day the typhoon turned to the northwest, and days later turned to the north while located about 150 miles (240 km) east of Bataan Province in the Philippines. After passing through the Ryūkyū Islands, it weakened as it turned to the northeast and east, and on October 17 it was last observed turning to the southeast over the open Pacific Ocean. A ship en route to Hong Kong on October 15 recorded a pressure of 968.0 hectopascals (28.59 inHg) and winds of over 75 mph (121 km/h) while located to the east of Taiwan. The passage of the typhoon caused 33 fatalities in Japan.

A low pressure area developed into a tropical depression on October 21 about 300 miles (480 km) northwest of Guam. After initially moving northwestward, it turned to the north and intensified into a typhoon on October 22. On October 23 it passed near or over the Ogasawara Islands, where a recording station reported a pressure of 996.0 hectopascals (29.41 inHg). The typhoon was last observed on October 23 accelerating northeastward.

=== November–December ===
On November 4 a tropical disturbance organized into a tropical depression while located about 300 miles (480 km) east of Mindanao. It moved quickly to the west-northwest, and struck the Philippine island of Samar without strengthening further. After passing through the archipelago, the storm entered the South China Sea late on November 5, and gradually weakened until dissipation on November 9 near southwestern Taiwan. A station in Santa Cruz in Laguna province recorded a pressure of 997.0 hectopascals (29.44 inHg), with at least one station in the Philippines reporting tropical storm force winds. Reports from the country indicate it was potentially a typhoon, though meteorologists decided it was not due to relatively high pressures and lack of significant convection to the southwest of the center.

A tropical depression formed on November 6 about 500 miles (800 km) east of Mindanao. It initially moved to the west-northwest, and gradually recurved to the northeast. After accelerating east-northeastward, the depression was last observed on November 13 as a remnant low pressure area over the open western Pacific Ocean. It is unknown if it strengthened into a tropical storm.

On November 22 a tropical depression formed to the east of Mindanao, and subsequently tracked to the northwest. Days later it stalled while located about 250 miles (400 km) east of Samar Island, and gradually weakened. Cold air intruded the circulation on November 25, and two days later it became extratropical.

A well-developed typhoon was first observed on November 29 while located about 150 miles (240 km) south of Yap. It moved to the northwest, and struck Samar Island on December 2. The typhoon continued northwestward through the archipelago, and gradually weakened while drifting through the South China Sea. It turned to the northeast, and dissipated on December 5 off the coast of northern Luzon. The typhoon produced heavy rainfall and strong winds along its path through the Philippines. Rivers throughout Masbate island were overflown from the abundant rainfall, causing 34 fatalities on the island. A station on Samar Island recorded a barometric minimum of 975.0 hectopascals (28.79 inHg).

An area of disturbed weather organized into a tropical depression on December 5 about 200 miles (320 km) southwest of Guam. After moving west-northwestward for several days, it turned to the northeast on December 9, during which it attained typhoon status. The typhoon maintained peak winds for about two days before quickly weakening to a remnant area of low pressure on December 11. A ship in the vicinity of the cyclone reported a minimum pressure of 952.0 hectopascals (28.11 inHg).

On December 16, a low pressure area quickly organized into a typhoon about 350 miles (560 km) east of Surigao. It moved quickly to the northwest at speeds of about 30 mph (48 km/h), faster than all but one previously known typhoon. The storm struck southeastern Luzon and turned to the north and north-northeast. After passing near Manila it reached open waters on December 20. For the following two days, it drifted eastward, possibly executing a loop, and after accelerating to the northeast it was last observed on December 24. A station at Sorsogon recorded a pressure of 998.0 hectopascals (29.47 inHg). While passing through the northern Philippines, the typhoon produced heavy rainfall, killing 19 on Masbate and 14 in northern Luzon.

The final typhoon of the season was first observed on December 22 about 225 miles (362 km) south of Guam. It initially moved to the northwest, and on December 24 the typhoon turned to the east-northeast. It steadily weakened, and was last observed on December 26 accelerating out to sea. The typhoon produced heavy rainfall and winds of around 50 mph (80 km/h) on Guam. The minimum pressure associated with the typhoon was a ship report of 995.0 hectopascals (29.38 inHg).

=== Hong Kong typhoon (Typhoon Twenty-Three) ===
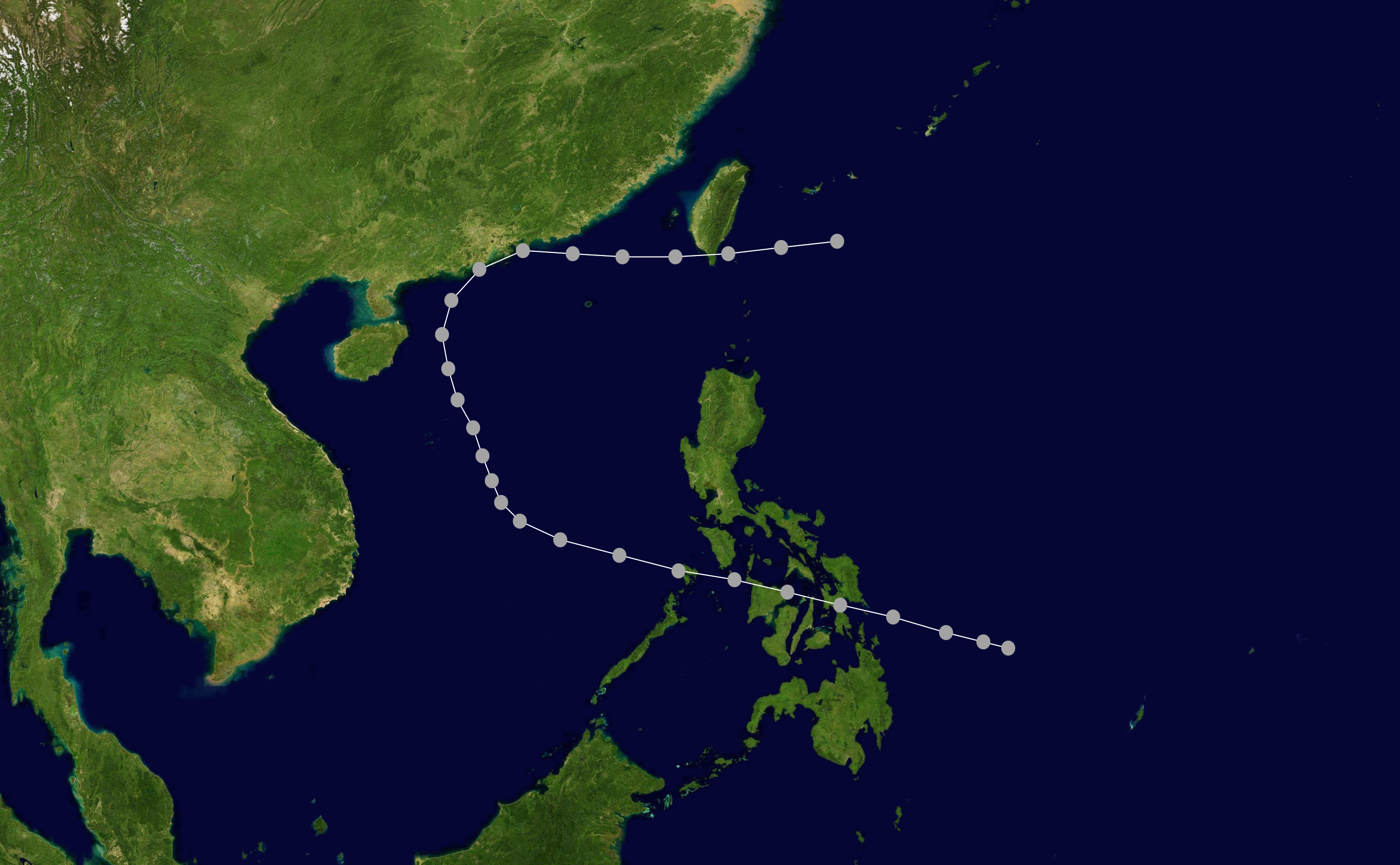
Track map of Typhoon Twenty-Three

On November 18 a tropical depression was first observed to the east of Mindanao. The depression steadily intensified as it tracked west-northwestward, and intensified into a typhoon before striking Samar Island and Leyte Island on November 19. It continued westward until reaching the western region of the South China Sea on November 22. An approaching cold front turned the typhoon to the northeast, resulting in a rare occurrence of a typhoon recurving northeastward in the western portion of the South China Sea. On November 24 the typhoon passed over Macau, and two hours later the eye crossed directly over Hong Kong. The calm of the center of the eye lasted for fifteen minutes at the Hong Kong Observatory, the first time on record that the calm of a typhoon was recorded there. The typhoon began to become extratropical after making landfall, and continued northeastward through southern China. It gradually weakened while passing through the Taiwan Strait and possibly over Taiwan before dissipating on November 26.

While crossing over the Philippines, a station in Capiz on Panay Island recorded a pressure of 981.0 hectopascals (28.97 inHg) as well as winds in excess of 55 mph (89 km/h). The passage of the typhoon sunk a motor boat on Masbate island, killing 48 of the 50 occupants aboard. One person was reported missing and presumed dead in Balangiga in Eastern Samar, believed to be caused by drowning. Property damage was great in Samar, Leyte, and Capiz provinces. In Hong Kong, wind gusts reached 74 mph (119 km/h) during a rainband ahead of the storm. Rainfall began seven hours before the arrival of the typhoon, and amounted to roughly 4.27 inches (108 mm). The heaviest rainfall occurred in rainbands ahead of the typhoon, with about 1.6 inches (41 mm) falling during a 1-hour time period. The lowest pressure recorded in Hong Kong was about 989.0 hectopascals (29.21 inHg) while the typhoon was passing through the area. Damage was minor in Hong Kong.

== See also ==
- 1939 Pacific hurricane season
- 1939 Atlantic hurricane season
- 1930s North Indian Ocean cyclone seasons
- 1900–1950 South-West Indian Ocean cyclone seasons
- 1900–1940 South Pacific cyclone seasons
- 1930s Australian region cyclone seasons
- Bernard Doucette
