= USS Pigeon (ASR-6) =

Minesweeper of the United States Navy

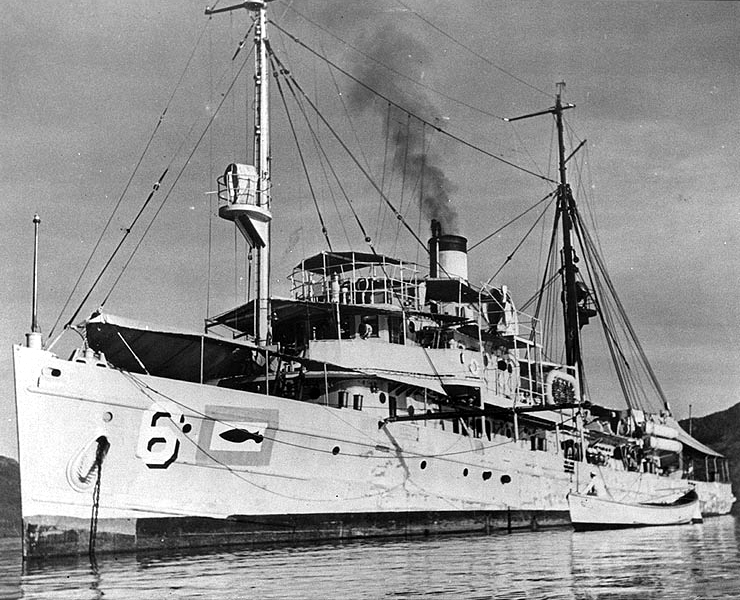
- USS Pigeon (ASR-6) anchored in Cam Ranh Bay on the coast of French Indochina in July 1939.

History

United States
- Name: USS Pigeon
- Namesake: Pigeon
- Operator: United States Navy
- Laid down: 15 June 1918
- Launched: 29 January 1919
- Sponsored by: Mrs. Joseph B. Provance
- Commissioned: 15 July 1919
- Reclassified: AM-47 on 17 July 1920
- Decommissioned: 25 April 1922
- Recommissioned: 13 October 1923
- Reclassified: ASR-6 on 12 September 1929
- Fate: Sunk 4 May 1942

General characteristics
- Class & type: Lapwing-class minesweeper
- Displacement: 950 long tons (965 t)
- Length: 187 ft 10 in (57.25 m)
- Beam: 35 ft 6 in (10.82 m)
- Draft: 9 ft 9 in (2.97 m)
- Installed power: 1,400 ihp (1,000 kW)
- Propulsion: 1 × Harlan and Hollingsworth, vertical triple-expansion steam engine; 1 × screw
- Speed: 14 kn (16 mph; 26 km/h)
- Complement: 72
- Armament: As built: 1 × 11-pounder gun; 2 × machine guns; World War II: 2 × 3 in (76 mm)/50 cal guns; 2 × 20 mm anti-aircraft autocannons

The first USS Pigeon (AM-47/ASR-6) was a Lapwing-class minesweeper of the United States Navy. She was later converted to a submarine rescue ship. She was named for the avian ambassador, the pigeon.

== Construction and commissioning ==
Pigeon was laid down by the Baltimore Dry Dock and Shipbuilding Company at Baltimore, Maryland. She was launched on 29 January 1919, sponsored by Mrs. Joseph B. Provance, and was commissioned at the Norfolk Navy Yard in Portsmouth, Virginia, on 15 July 1919. When the U.S. Navy assigned hull classification symbols to ships on 17 July 1920, Pigeon was designated AM-47.

== Service history ==
=== Inter-war period ===
Pigeon departed Norfolk to serve the Pacific Mine Force at Naval Station San Diego in San Diego, California, transited the Panama Canal on 7 December 1919, and reached San Diego on 25 December 1919. Pearl Harbor, Hawaii, became her new base of operations on 18 June 1920, and she decommissioned there on 25 April 1922. Converted to a gunboat, she recommissioned at Pearl Harbor on 13 October 1923.

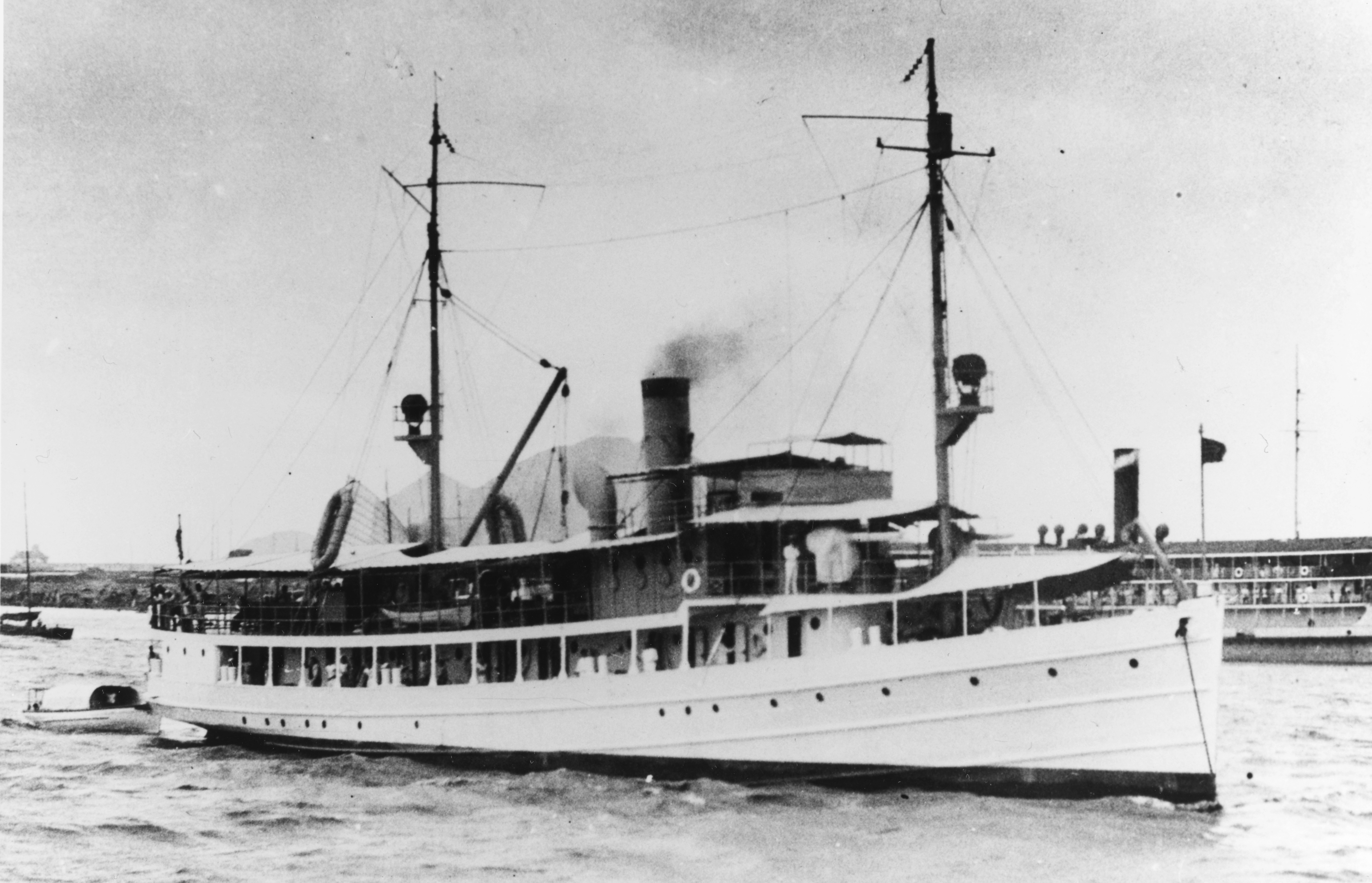
Pigeon in Chinese waters, c. the later 1920s, showing modifications made to fit her as a gunboat for use on the Yangtze River.

Still classified a minesweeper, Pigeon departed Pearl Harbor on 7 November 1923 and joined the Yangtze River Patrol Force at Shanghai, China, on 26 November 1923. For five years, she served in the patrol, protecting American citizens and commerce during the Chinese Civil War. She began serving Submarine Division 16 (SubDiv 16) in the United States Asiatic Fleet in September 1928. After ranging from the Philippines to the China coast, she fitted out as a “submarine salvage vessel” at the Cavite Naval Station on Luzon in the Philippines from April to July 1929. She departed Manila Bay on 13 July 1929 to cruise with Asiatic Fleet submarines along the China coast until returning to Manila on 11 September 1929. The following day, she was reclassified a submarine rescue vessel and redesignated ASR-6.

As a submarine rescue vessel, Pigeon's primary mission was to aid and salvage submarines in distress. She had a complement of divers and was equipped with deep-sea diving equipment. She had a McCann Rescue Chamber for rescuing men from sunken submarines. Pigeon also had a helium-mixing tank for aiding divers in making deep dives. Her recompression chamber was a complete “divers hospital” to prevent decompression sickness — the "bends" — in divers subjected to sudden ascents from deep depths.

The French Navy submarine Phénix failed to resurface after a mock attack on the light cruiser Lamotte-Picquet during training maneuvers in the South China Sea off Cam Ranh, French Indochina, on 15 June 1939, and after her wreck was located 12 nautical miles (22 km; 14 mi) northeast of the island of Hon Chut on 16 June 1939 with its stern resting on the seabed at a depth of 105 metres (344 ft) and its bow floating at a depth of 40 metres (131 ft), Pigeon was dispatched to render assistance. French salvage efforts to place a chain around Phénix′s hull so that it could be towed into shallower water succeeded only in dragging her into waters with a depth of 95 metres (312 ft) and, although Pigeon arrived on the scene on 28 June 1939, Phénix still lay too deep for Pigeon′s divers to reach her. Phénix was lost with all hands.

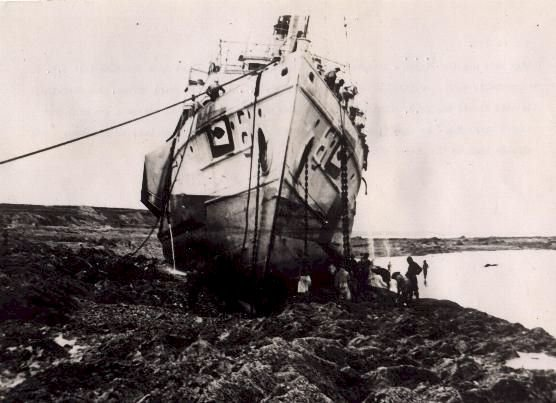
USS Pigeon grounded on the coast of China after a September 1939 typhoon

Pigeon ran aground on the coast of China during a typhoon on 2 September 1939, but was salvaged. She continued duty with the Submarine Force of the Asiatic Fleet in waters ranging from the Philippines to the coast of China. She departed Shanghai, China, for Manila in the Philippines on 19 August 1940, arriving on 24 August 1940, and remained in the Philippines as the Japanese gained control of the coastal ports of China during the Second Sino-Japanese War.

=== World War II ===
==== 1941 ====
In November 1941, the 4th Marines evacuated Shanghai and ships of the Yangtze River Patrol were withdrawn from China. Pigeon was one of the ships ordered to escort the American gunboats from Chinese waters. She departed for Cavite from Formosa Straits 28–29 November 1941.

Pigeon rendezvoused near midnight of 30 November-1 December 1941 with the gunboats Luzon and Oahu (flagship) and minesweeper Finch. A Japanese seaplane circled the formation on the morning of 1 December 1941. For about eight hours, beginning at noon, seven Japanese warships encircled the American gunboats. One transport—loaded with troops (apparently bound for the Malayan expedition)—held gunnery exercises on the gunboat formation. The episode ended about 19:00 when a Japanese transport hoisted an International signal translated: "Enemy escaping on course 180." On 4 December, Pigeon sighted Corregidor Light and the convoy entered Manila Bay.

On receiving word of the attack on Pearl Harbor, Lt. Comdr. Richard E. Hawes immediately prepared to get Pigeon underway and stood by to evacuate the Cavite Navy Yard. While waiting for the enemy to appear, he crammed the ship with stores and salvage and repair supplies and equipment.

"Spittin’ Dick" Hawes had already become a legend among submariners. He had a reputation of superb loyalty to subordinates and was known for his ingenuity with men and the materials at hand. A special act of Congress elevated him to officer rank on 18 February 1929 in recognition of his salvage feats on submarines S-51 and S-4. He had entered the Navy as a Fireman in 1917 and had earned the Navy Cross for distinguished service in salvaging submarine S-51 in 1925–1926. He later served in several "S-boats", at the New London Submarine Base, became a Master Diver, then joined the staff of SubDiv 4. He commanded submarine salvage ship Falcon from 1935 to 1938, served as Officer in Command of the Submarine Escape Training Tank at the Submarine Base in Hawaii, then took command of Pigeon on 12 February 1940.

Pigeon was moored in a five-ship nest at the Cavite Navy Yard on 10 December 1941 when Japanese bombers launched massive raids. But Commander Hawes had relieving tackles rigged, steam at throttle, and men ready for action. His foresight saved Pigeon and submarine Seadragon.

Pigeon's four machine guns—two .50 in (12.7 mm) and two .30 in (7.62 mm)—were no match for Japan's high-altitude bombers, but she could outsmart them. She cleared the dock lashed to Quail then cut loose and both ships maneuvered clear of bombs which fell close astern.

Soon Cavite Navy Yard was engulfed in explosions and flames. In the nest which Pigeon had occupied lay submarine Sealion—her pressure hull pierced by bomb hits and beyond salvage—and Seadragon, damaged and without power to get underway. With them were the minesweeper Bittern with a gasoline lighter as well as another lighter moored astern.

While Pigeon maneuvered to save Seadragon, Machinist Rollin M. Reed and Watertender Wayne E. Taylor jumped in a surf boat to haul the burning lighter clear, moved the gasoline lighter out of reach of flames, then assisted another small boat in hauling Bittern from the dock to safety.

Soon, the flames and explosions reached the torpedo overhaul shop exploding torpedo warheads which hurled fiery missiles over Pigeon. Nevertheless, Pigeon calmly placed her stern across the end piling and ran a line some 20 ft (6.1 m) to Seadragon and hauled the submarine clear of the dock.

Seadragon's hull was already scorched from flames that swept the wharf. Just as Pigeon pulled the submarine backward to the channel, a big fuel tank exploded and spewed a horizontal wave of fire that blistered the hulls of both ships. Once Seadragon reached the channel, her skillful crew worked her out into the Bay. Her leaks were plugged and her pressure hull was patched by submarine tender Canopus when she departed for Surabaya, Java on 16 December. Pigeon received the first Presidential Unit Citation awarded a ship of the United States Navy for her heroism in saving Seadragon.

But Pigeon had "not yet begun to fight". By the end of the month, her sailors had earned a second Presidential Unit Citation for fighting ability not expected of men in a little support craft.

Lt. Comdr. Hawes reported: "The courage, spirit, and efficiency of the Pigeon crew is believed unsurpassed by past, present, or any future crews of any vessel of any nation." While the Navy Yard was still in flames, her crew was attempting to secure heavier armament for their ship. She armed herself with a 3 in (76 mm) gun from fire-damaged Bittern and another from Sealion. Sheets of boiler plate were fashioned into gun and splinter shields for six .50 in (12.7 mm) machine guns which circled the bridge. "The Pigeon is well armed," wrote Hawes, "and is believed to be the best equipped vessel of her type and tonnage in existence."

Not content to fend for herself, Pigeon worked tirelessly to help her sister ships and the other defenders of the Philippines. She replaced the 3 in (76 mm) gun on minesweeper Tanager. She fed an average of 125 men daily, and salvaged valuable equipment from submarine Sealion. She also salvaged and transported deck loads of torpedoes to "Old Lady" Canopus to keep the Asiatic Fleet submarines armed. When Manila was declared an open city, she towed Bittern to Mariveles. She made underwater repairs to submarine Porpoise, supplied submarine S-33 with both fresh and battery water; and, towed all manner of supply-laden barges and small craft between Manila, Corregidor, Bataan, and Mariveles. She even charged air flasks for the torpedoes of PT boats.

During a bombing attack on Corregidor, her gunners blasted away at three twin-engined aircraft flying over the eastern end of the island. One exploded between Monja Island light and Corregidor, and the other two crashed just beyond the minefield. Pigeon scored again the following day when an enemy observation plane made the mistake of passing overhead, then turned back for a closer look. Shells from Pigeon ripped into the enemy aircraft which sideslipped, lost altitude, and headed out to sea.

By the end of December, Manila Bay was no longer a suitable area for submarines. Only those just back from patrol remained. These evacuated highly trained submariners to new Pacific bases in Java and Australia where they formed the nucleus maintenance crews that kept the American submarine forces on patrol.

==== 1942 ====
On 5 January 1942, Lt. Comdr. Hawes turned over command of Pigeon to LCDR Frank Alfred Davis, USNR, and became the first lieutenant of submarine tender Holland.

Since Japanese warships outside Manila Bay made it unlikely for her to escape, Pigeon remained behind with Canopus, a few old gunboats, and small craft to fight with the Fil-American army of Bataan.

She again fought off enemy aircraft, towed between Mariveles and Corregidor; conducted diving operations for salvage, scuttled equipment and destroyed munitions that might fall into Japanese hands; and also established a lookout station at Gorda Point, Bataan. On the night of 5 January, she sneaked into Japanese-occupied Sangley Point Naval Station, at Cavite, and snatched a barge of submarine mines from under the nose of the enemy. Men armed to the teeth stepped quickly and quietly from a whaleboat, made a towline fast, and returned to Pigeon. As an added act of defiance the landing party ignited several barrels of aviation gasoline.

Pigeon kept up her energetic pace of support in the Philippines' defense. Back in February 1942, she deprived the enemy of two ammunition lighters and salvaged some 160,000 gallons (605,600 L) of fuel oil from merchantman S.S. Don Jose enabling the gunboats to stay on patrol. She also repelled six enemy dive bombers, knocking down one and damaging another which later crashed on Bataan. She set up a repair base at Sisiman Dock at Sisiman Cove, using a submarine repair barge to tend small craft of the inshore patrol and for Philippine "Q boats". She also fueled a submarine at South Dock, Corregidor.

In March 1942, Pigeon salvaged and concealed gasoline drums ashore at Sisiman Cove, fueled a submarine and gunboats, and towed several lighters between Corregidor and Bataan. She also salvaged and repaired S.S. Floricita and towed her from the beach at Corregidor to Mariveles. In April she dueled with enemy artillery at Cabcaben, Bataan and again fought off enemy aircraft.

Bataan fell on 9 April, and—rather than surrender to the enemy—Canopus backed away from the dock and was scuttled at the hands of her own crew. That night, Pigeon made rendezvous with fleet submarine Snapper under the enemy guns in the south channel off Corregidor. Snapper had brought 46 short tons (42 t) of food and stores for beleaguered Corregidor and Pigeon hurried to load the cargo before the start of night bombing raids.

=== Fate ===
After the fall of Bataan, Pigeon's crew spent the days on shore and returned to their ship for night operations that included dumping Philippine currency in the channel south of Corregidor. She continued to serve until the afternoon of 4 May, when a bomb from a dive bomber exploded on her starboard quarter. She sank in eight minutes but her crew was safe on shore.

The Japanese later captured the sailors, Many survived the war.

Lt. Comdr. Frank Alfred Davis carried on the fighting tradition and valor of his command while interned at the infamous prisoner-of-war camp at Cabanatuan, Philippine Islands. He built a powerful underground organization to obtain food, medicines and communications of all kinds. He volunteered for command of a firewood detail, and despite the constant surveillance of Japanese guards, succeeded in smuggling into camp tremendous amounts of food and other necessities to his fellow prisoners. He died on 14 December 1944 aboard the hell-ship Oryoku Maru. Lt. Comdr. Davis received the Navy Cross for his intrepid fight on Canopus and Pigeon and was posthumously awarded the Legion of Merit.

== Awards ==
- Presidential Unit Citation - two awards
- China Service Medal
- American Defense Service Medal
- Asiatic-Pacific Campaign Medal with one battle star
- World War Two Victory Medal
