= 1939 Atlantic hurricane season =

- Season summary map

Seasonal boundaries
- First system formed: June 12, 1939
- Last system dissipated: November 6, 1939

Strongest storm
- Name: Five
  - Maximum winds: 140 mph (220 km/h) (1-minute sustained)
  - Lowest pressure: 941 mbar (hPa; 27.79 inHg)

Seasonal statistics
- Total depressions: 10
- Total storms: 6
- Hurricanes: 3
- Major hurricanes (Cat. 3+): 1
- Total fatalities: 11
- Total damage: Unknown

Related articles
- 1939 Pacific hurricane season; 1939 Pacific typhoon season; 1930s North Indian Ocean cyclone seasons

The 1939 Atlantic hurricane season was the least active since 1930. The season had below normal activity, with only six tropical storms, of which three became hurricanes and one became a major hurricane, equivalent to Category 3 status or higher on the modern-day Saffir–Simpson scale. The first tropical cyclone formed on June 12, and the last dissipated on November 6. These dates are within the period of each year when most tropical cyclones form in the Atlantic basin.

All of the storms affected land to some extent. The first two cyclones of the season made landfall along the coast of the United States, collectively causing only minor damage. Hurricane Five, the strongest of the year, peaked as a Category 4 hurricane, with maximum sustained winds of 140 mph (220 km/h) and a minimum atmospheric pressure of 941 mbar (27.8 inHg). It took a northeastern path through the western Atlantic, striking Bermuda on October 16. The fifth and final storm was a minimal hurricane that wrought damage throughout the western Caribbean Sea, most notably in Jamaica and Cuba.

The season's activity was reflected with an accumulated cyclone energy (ACE) rating of 34 units, far below the 1931–1943 average of 91.2. ACE is a metric used to express the energy used by a tropical cyclone during its lifetime. Therefore, a storm with a longer duration will have high values of ACE. It is only calculated at six-hour increments in which specific tropical and subtropical systems are either at or above sustained wind speeds of 39 mph (63 km/h), which is the threshold for tropical storm intensity. Thus, tropical depressions are not included here.

== Systems ==
=== Tropical Storm One ===
- Tropical storm (SSHWS)
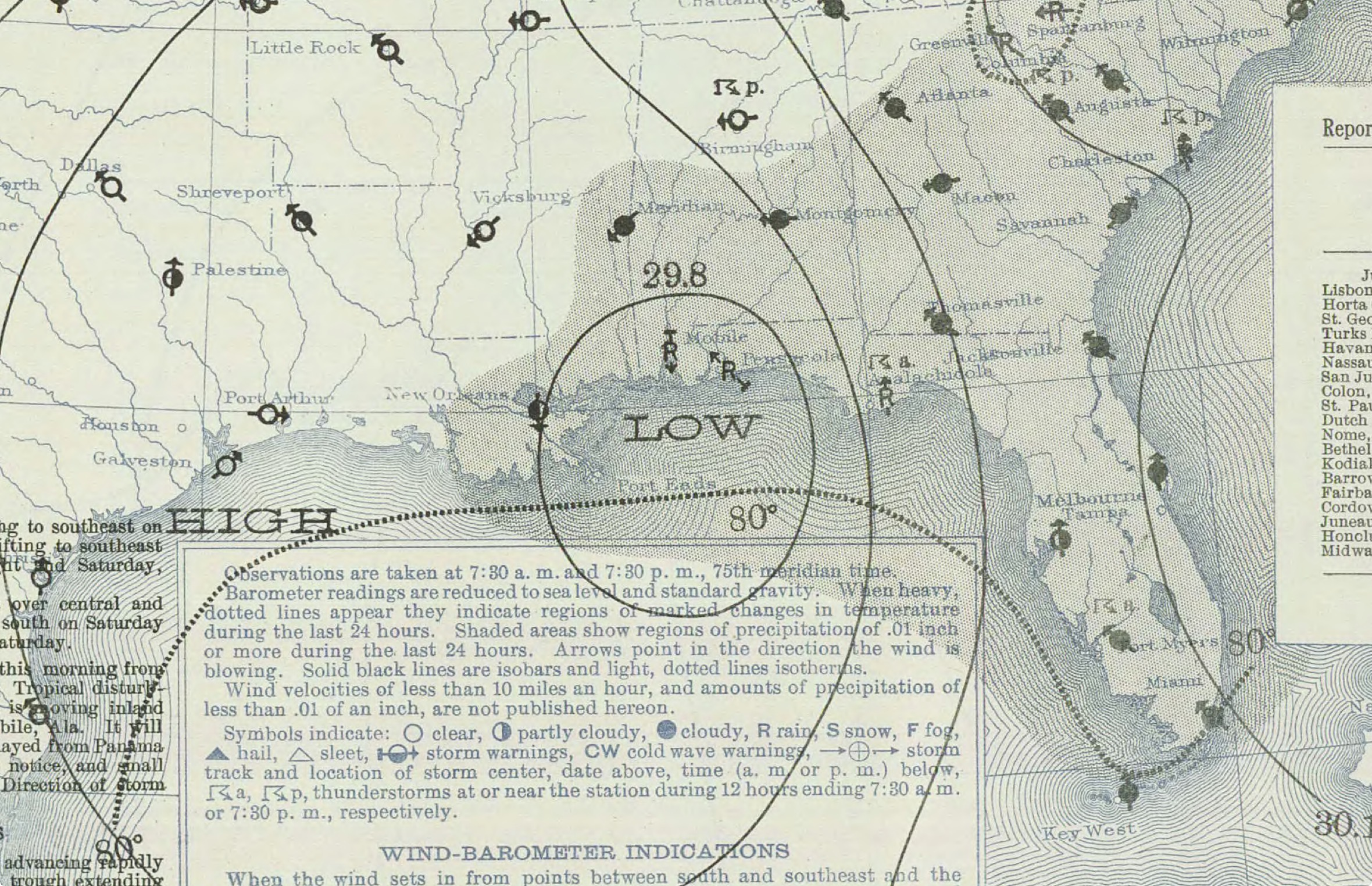
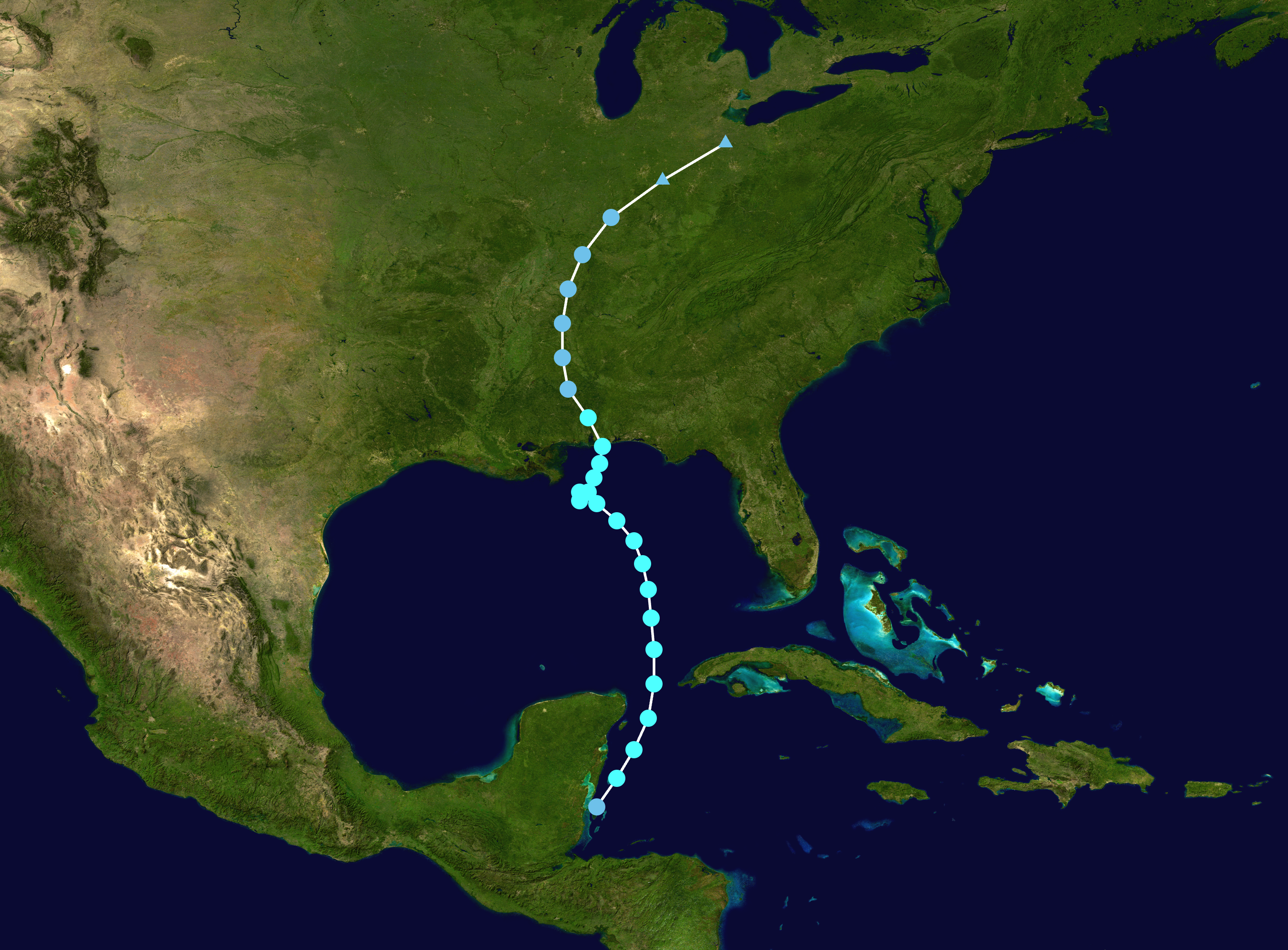
- Duration: June 12 – June 18
- Peak intensity: 65 mph (100 km/h) (1-min); ≤999 mbar (hPa)

The first tropical storm of the season developed in the extreme western Caribbean Sea on June 12. Reports of the storm first came from the Mexican Weather Service office in Chetumal, Quintana Roo, and during the afternoon of June 12, vessels just offshore recorded squally conditions and choppy seas. The cyclone moved northward, parallel to the coast of Belize, before moving over the northeastern corner of the Yucatán Peninsula. It continued steadily northward through the Gulf of Mexico, slowly strengthening to a peak of 50 mph (85 km/h) on June 14 with a minimum central pressure of 1,000 mbar (30 inHg). An area of high pressure to the north caused the storm to execute a counter-clockwise loop. A trough of low pressure turned it back to the north, and the cyclone made landfall near Mobile, Alabama, as a minimal tropical storm on June 16. Turning to the northwest, it quickly weakened to a tropical depression and dissipated on June 17 over Mississippi.

In advance of the system, officials issued storm warnings for coastal areas of Alabama and western Florida, and residents in low-lying areas were advised to seek higher ground. Damage associated with the cyclone was generally minor, and only one life was lost when a boy fell into the swollen waters of a river and drowned.

=== Hurricane Two ===
- Category 1 hurricane (SSHWS)
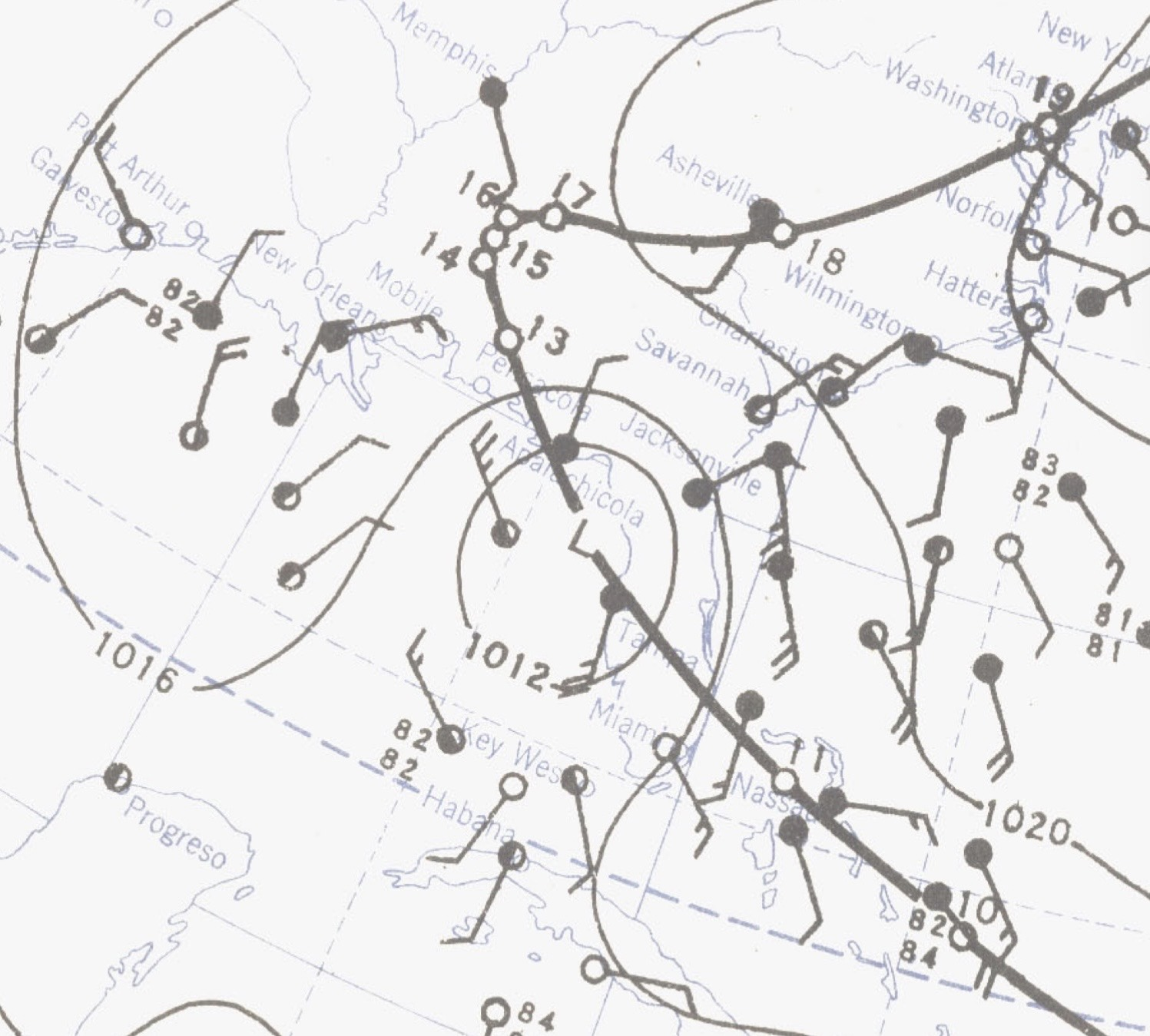
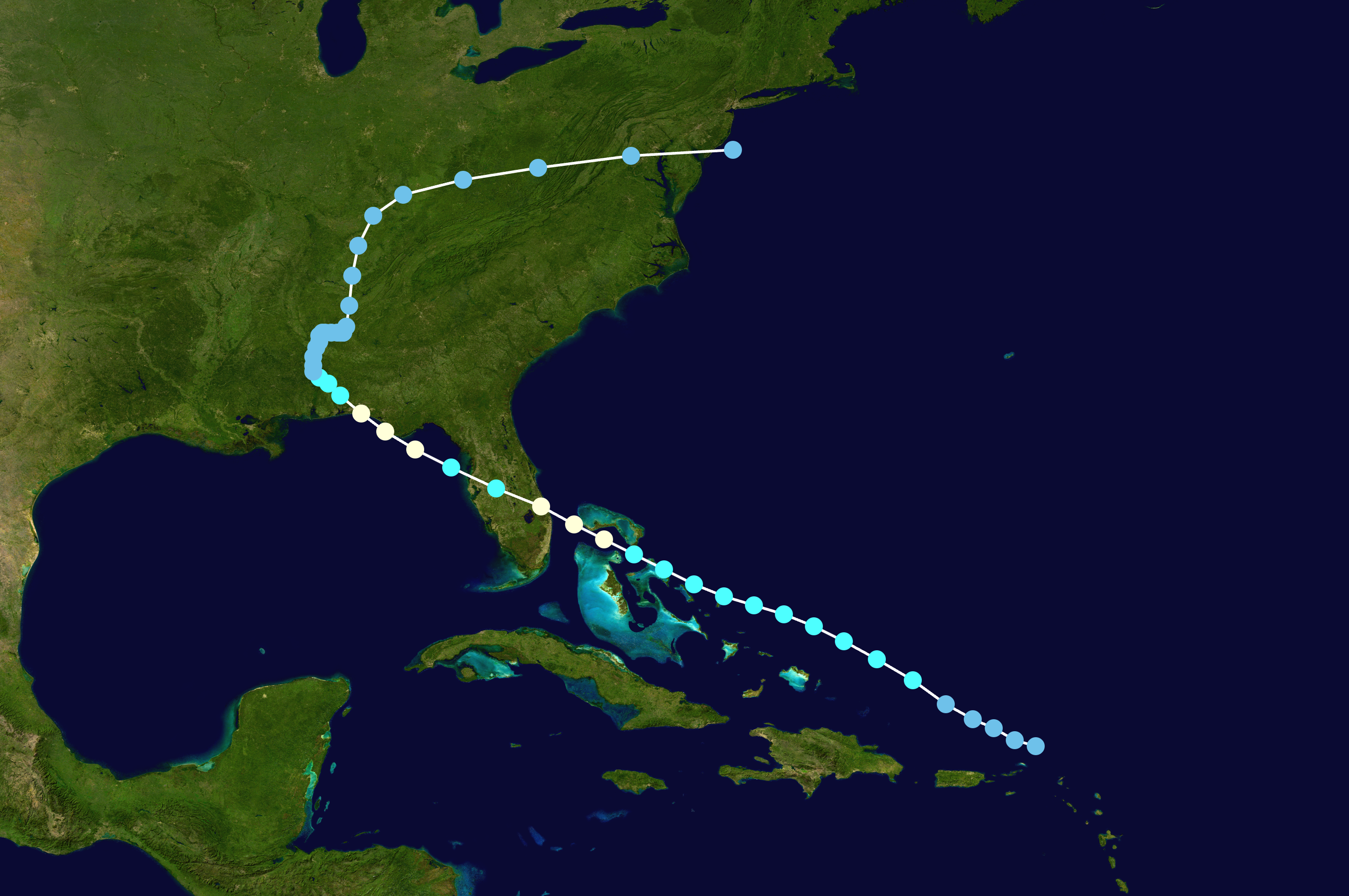
- Duration: August 7 – August 19
- Peak intensity: 75 mph (120 km/h) (1-min); 985 mbar (hPa)

On August 7, a tropical storm formed north of the Leeward Islands, likely from a tropical wave. It tracked to the west-northwest, slowly strengthening to a hurricane as it moved through the Bahamas on August 11. Later that day, it struck the east coast of Florida near Stuart, and crossed the state in around 15 hours. After weakening to a tropical storm, it quickly re-strengthened upon emerging into the Gulf of Mexico, and made another landfall near Apalachicola, Florida, on August 13. Over land, the cyclone slowed considerably and quickly deteriorated. By August 14, the storm had weakened to a tropical depression as it drifted through Alabama. The depression turned to the northeast, and remained a tropical depression until it dissipated just offshore New Jersey on August 20. Due to timely reports and warnings, the storm was reportedly forecast with "exceptional accuracy".

In Florida, damage was minor, amounting to uprooted trees, broken windows, moderate crop damage, and downed power lines. A few flimsy structures and small watercraft also sustained damage. Along the Florida Panhandle, the storm's winds impacted power, telephone, and telegraph lines, and inflicted $2,000 worth of damage to a dock warehouse. A man in Cedar Key, Florida, drowned after rough surf overturned his rowboat, and at least two other people suffered minor storm-related injuries. Torrential rain fell in Alabama as a result of the storm's slow forward movement, leading to severe flooding. Further inland, the storm spawned a tornado in North Carolina which caused one death. As the depression continued heading inland, it dropped heavy precipitation throughout the Mid-Atlantic States, exceeding 14 in (360 mm) in Tuckerton, New Jersey, and 18 in (460 mm) in Manahawkin, New Jersey.

=== Tropical Storm Three ===
- Tropical storm (SSHWS)
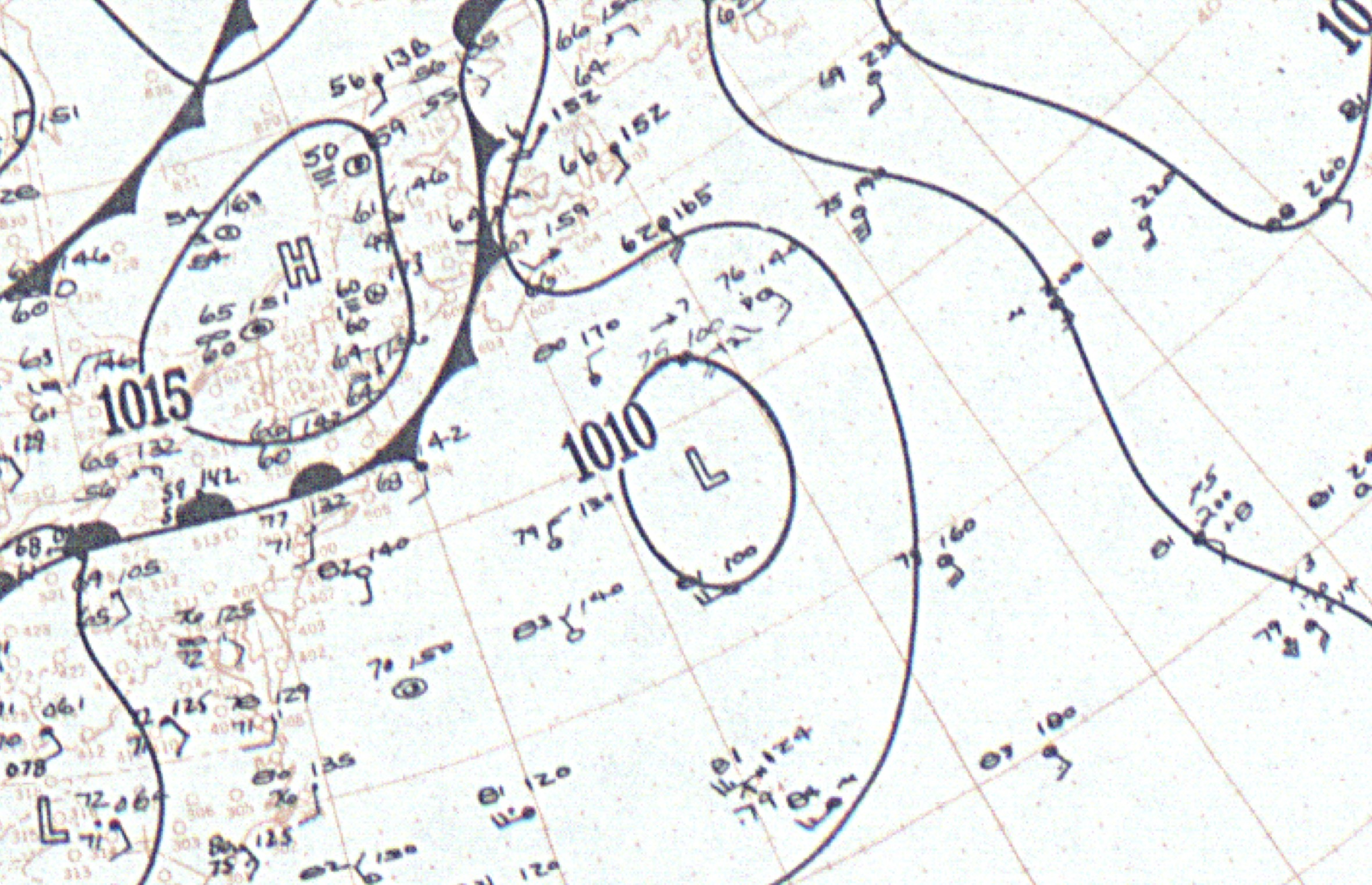
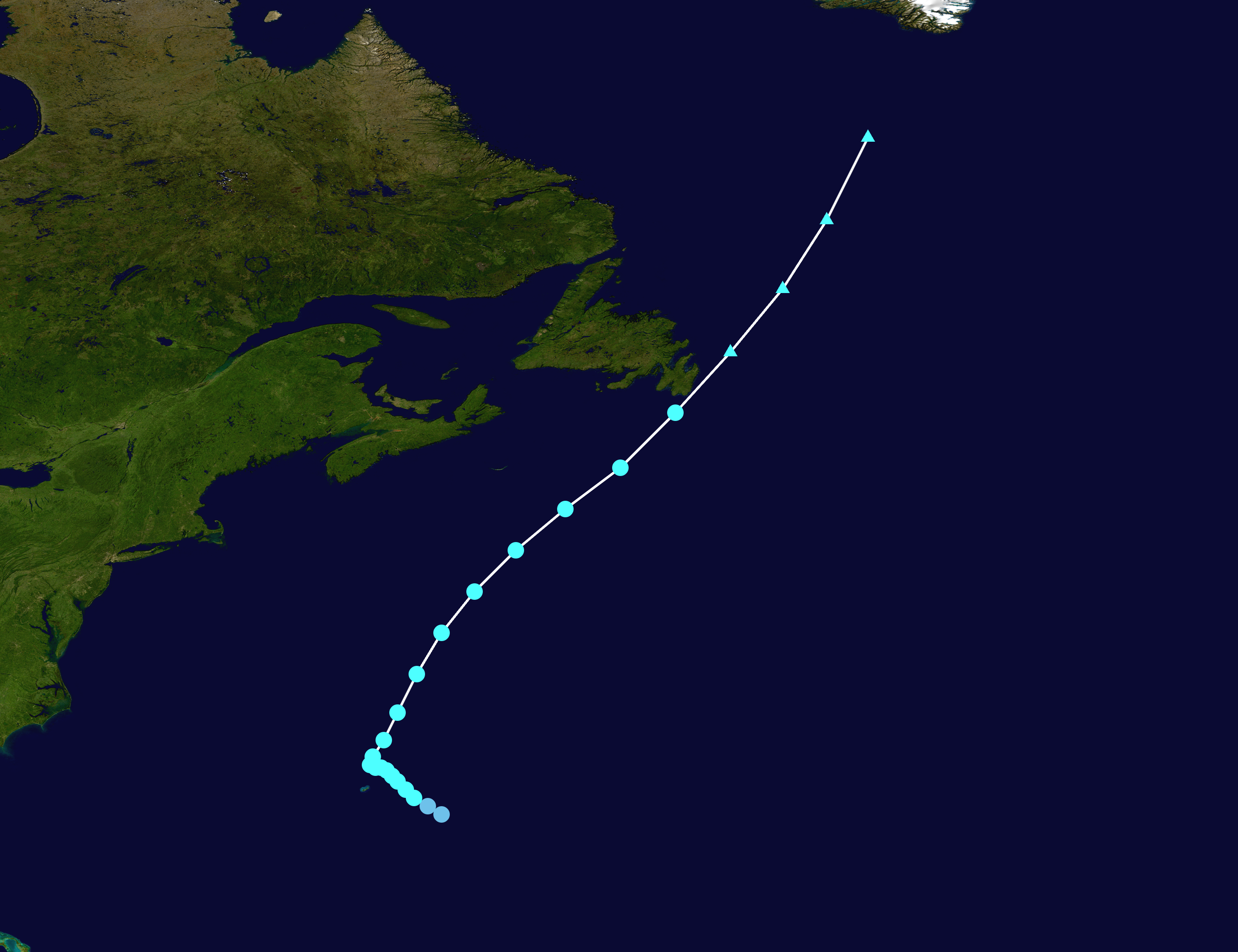
- Duration: August 15 – August 19
- Peak intensity: 65 mph (100 km/h) (1-min); <1000 mbar (hPa)

An operationally unnoticed tropical storm developed on August 15. At its peak, sustained winds were 65 mph (100 km/h) and the minimum pressure of 1,000 mbar (30 inHg). By August 19, the storm dissipated.

=== Tropical Storm Four ===
- Tropical storm (SSHWS)
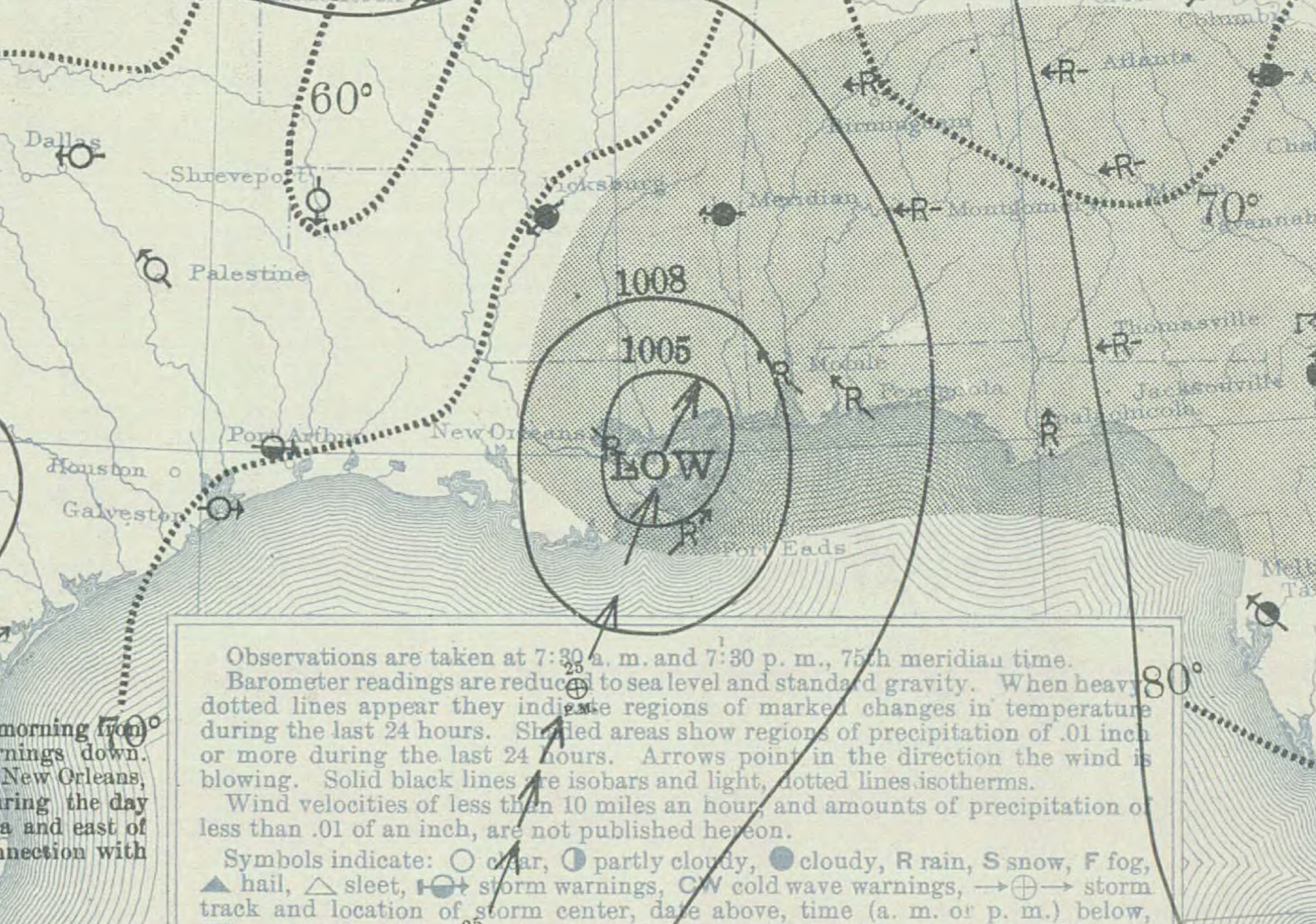
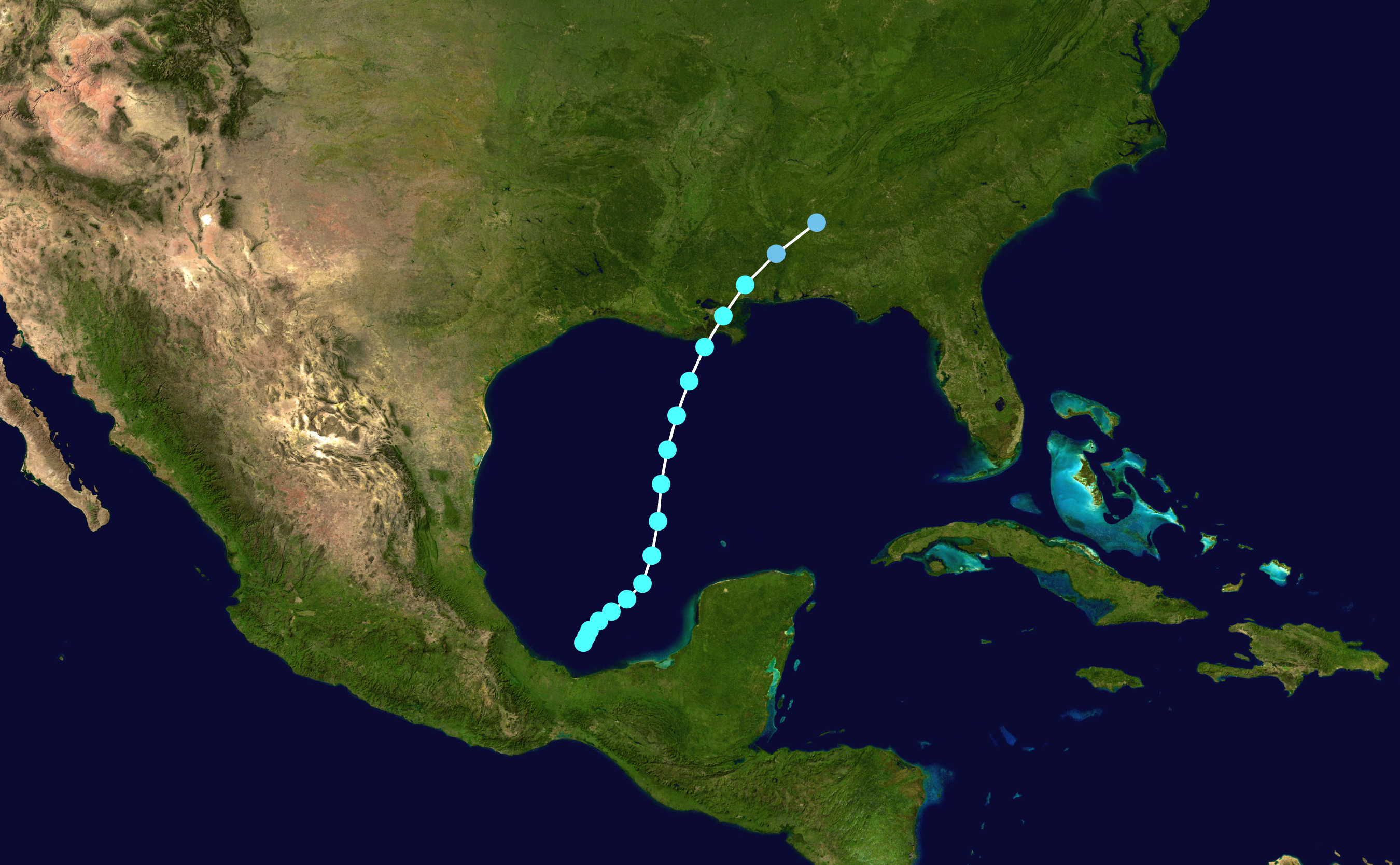
- Duration: September 23 – September 27
- Peak intensity: 50 mph (85 km/h) (1-min); <1004 mbar (hPa)

An area of disturbed weather over Central America organized into a tropical storm in the Bay of Campeche on September 23. Uneventfully, it moved generally north-northeastward through the Gulf of Mexico and its winds strengthened to a peak of 50 mph (85 km/h). The storm made landfall on south-central Louisiana on September 26, and dissipated later that day. The Weather Bureau office in New Orleans posted numerous advisories, although the effects from the storm were minimal.

=== Hurricane Five ===
- Category 4 hurricane (SSHWS)
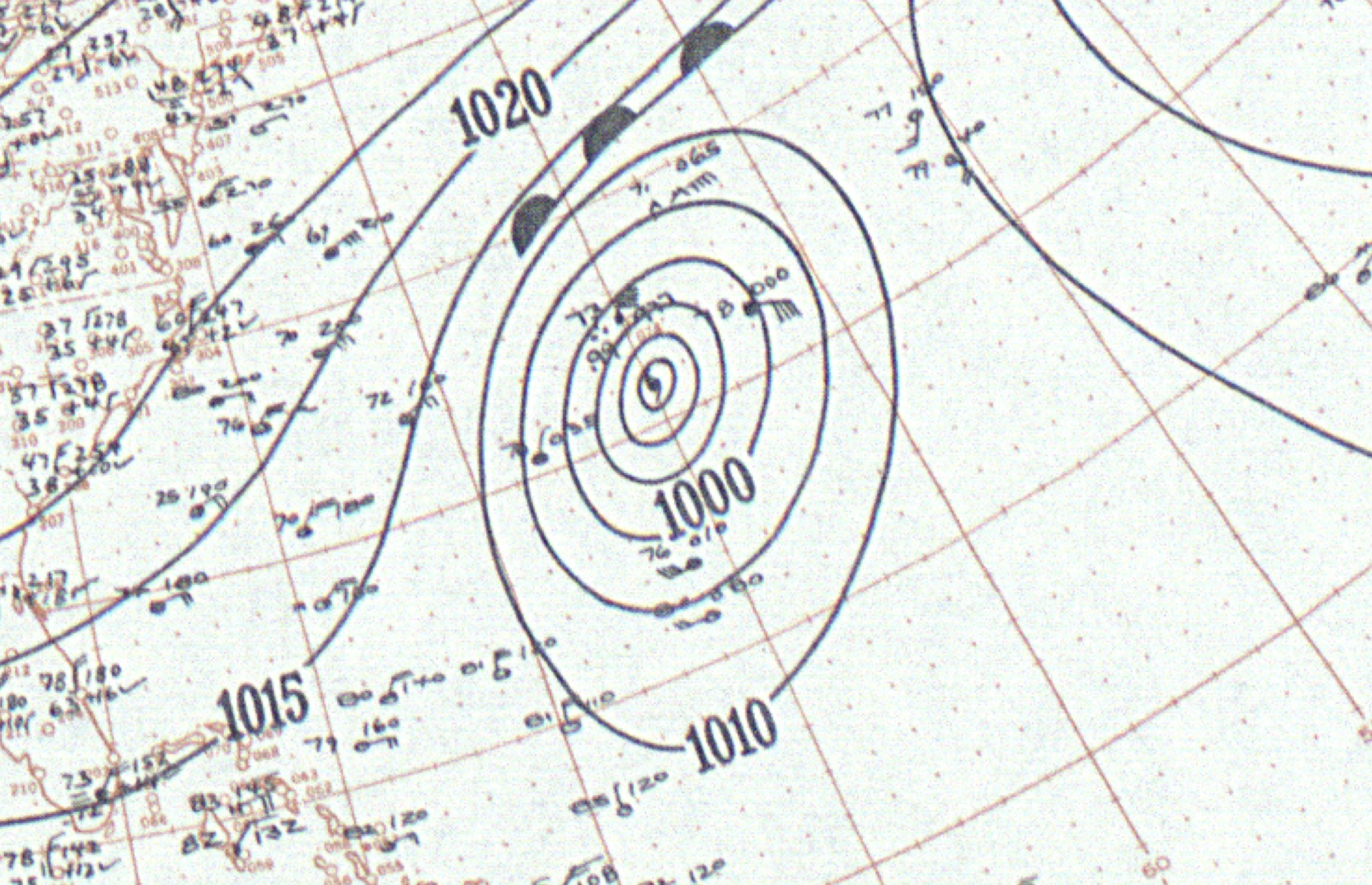
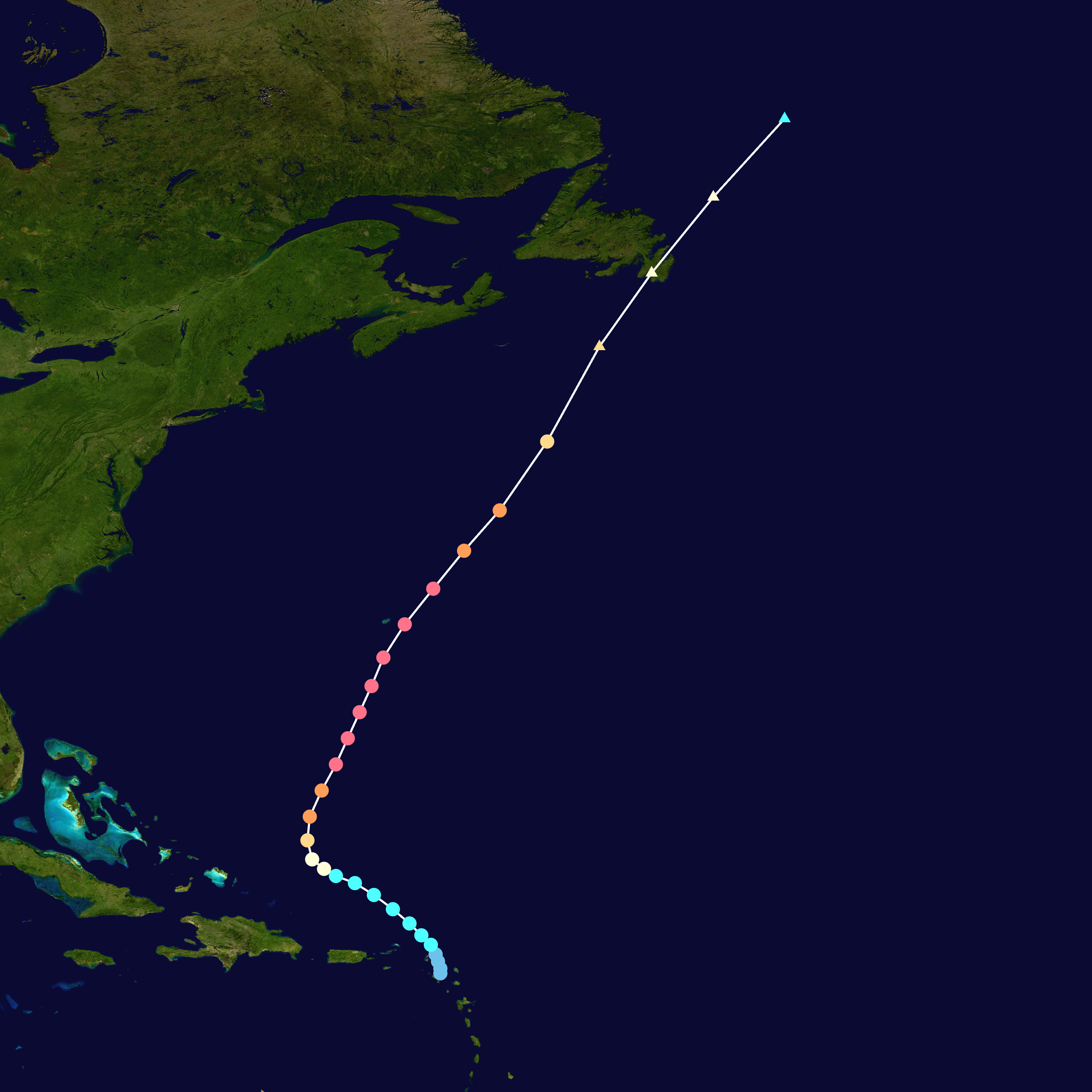
- Duration: October 12 – October 17
- Peak intensity: 140 mph (220 km/h) (1-min); ≤941 mbar (hPa)

On the afternoon of October 9, reports from the Leeward Islands of low pressures and unsettled weather indicated that a storm was forming in the vicinity. The disturbance strengthened into a tropical storm on October 12 to the northeast of Puerto Rico. The quickly escalating storm tracked northwestward before turning towards the northeast, away from a high pressure area building in from the west. Early on October 15, the storm attained hurricane intensity and continued to mature until October 16, when it reached its peak at a strength corresponding to Category 4 status on the modern-day Saffir-Simpson Hurricane Scale. That same day it passed just east of Bermuda. It weakened as it accelerated to the northeast, and became extratropical near Newfoundland a couple of days later.

Numerous ships encountered the hurricane along its course. On the President Harding, en route to New York, one crew member drowned due to the rough conditions and 73 crew and passengers suffered injury, of various severity, requiring a call for emergency medical supplies. The ship itself sustained a bit of damage. As the storm passed near the island of Bermuda, it generated strong winds—gusting to 131 mph (211 km/h)—and heavy precipitation. Damage was fairly significant; the winds uprooted trees, shattered windows, and disrupted public utilities. In Newfoundland, the remnants of the storm destroyed a house in St. John's and caused minor flooding in other areas of the province. Six people drowned offshore Newfoundland.

=== Hurricane Six ===
- Category 1 hurricane (SSHWS)
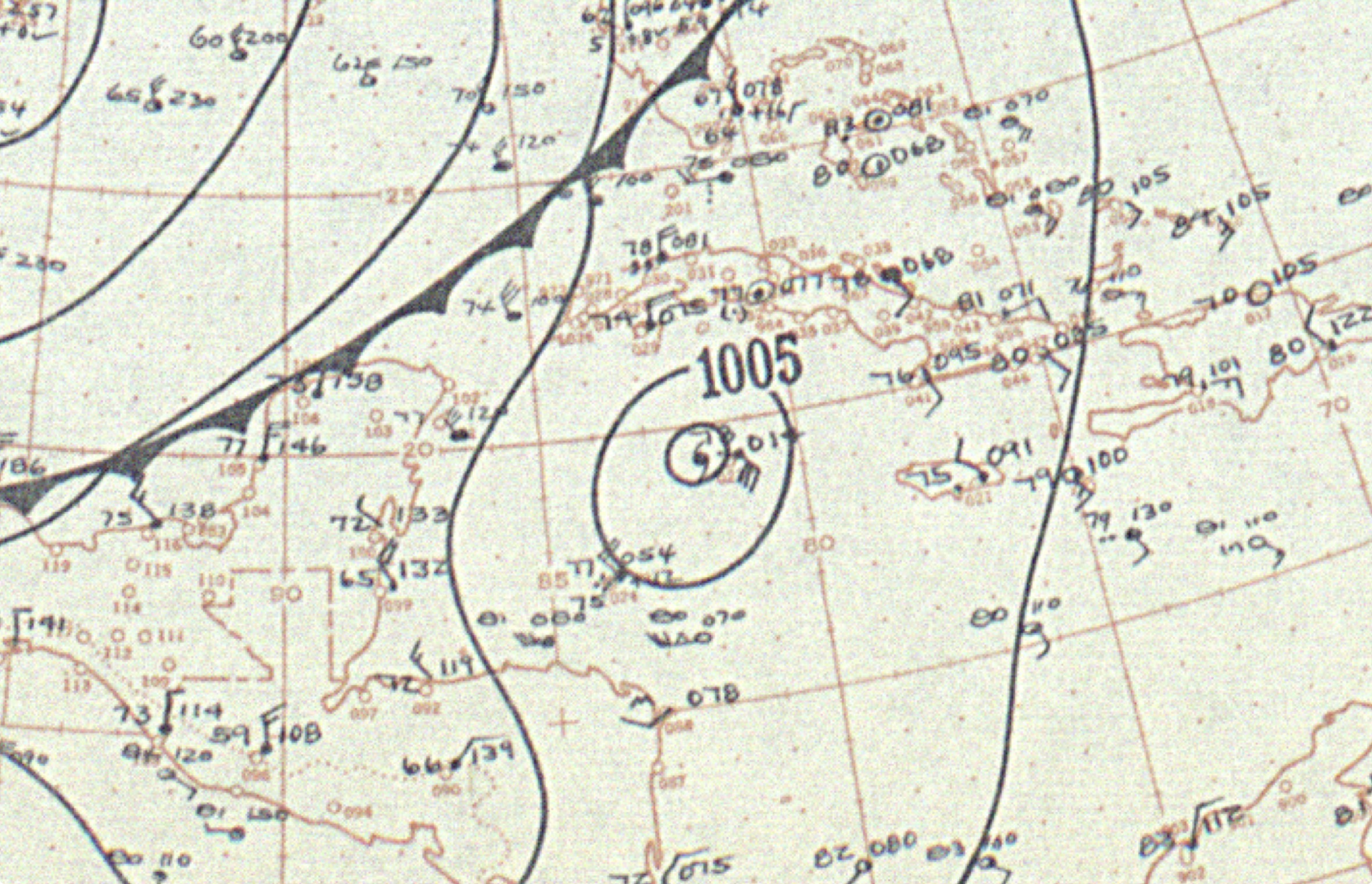
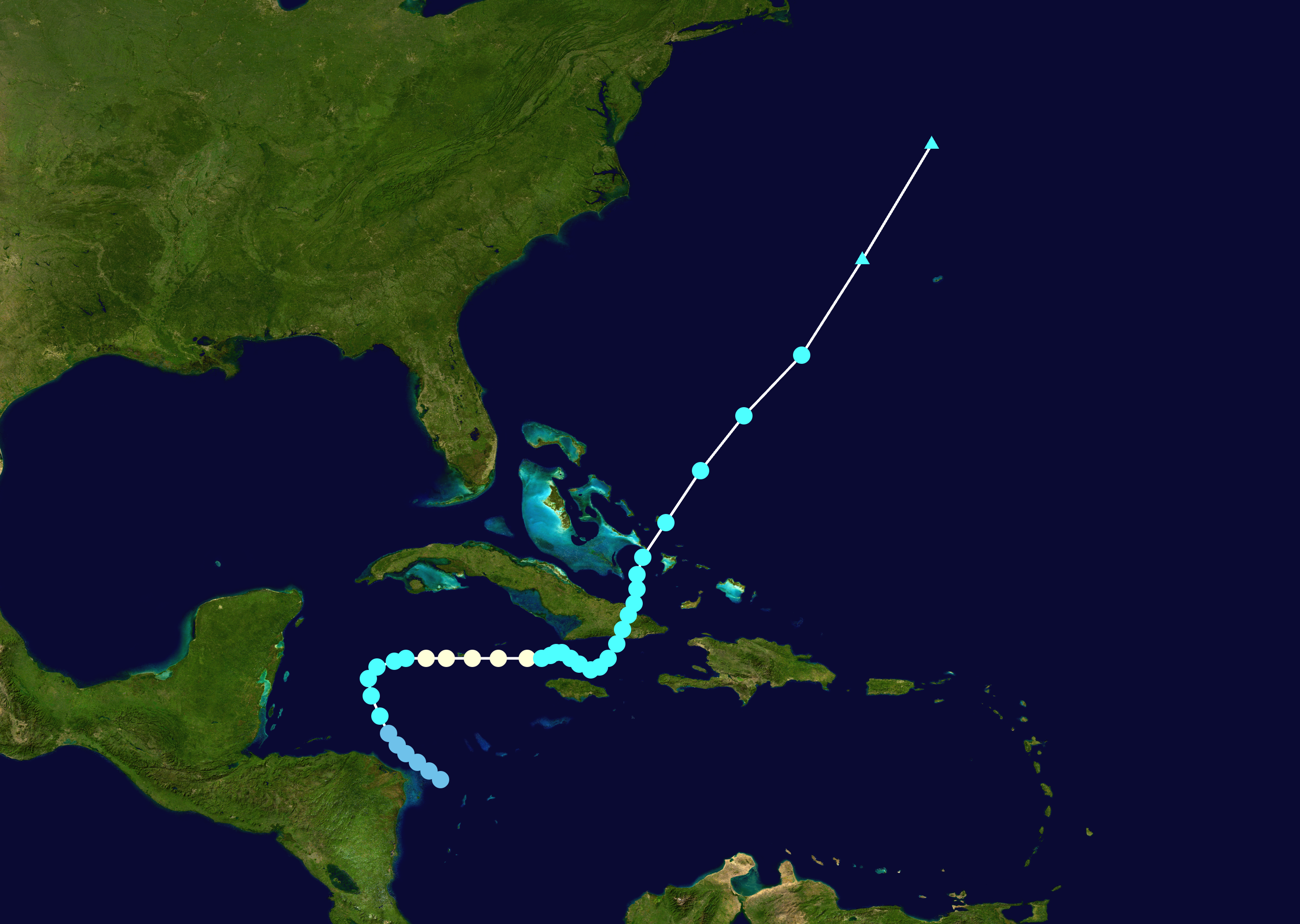
- Duration: October 28 – November 6
- Peak intensity: 90 mph (150 km/h) (1-min); ≤989 mbar (hPa)

On October 29, the sixth and final known tropical cyclone of the season developed in the western Caribbean Sea from a tropical wave. It initially moved northwestward, but turned toward the east shortly thereafter. Drifting due eastward, the storm grew into a minimal hurricane on October 31 while passing over the Cayman Islands. The hurricane's center passed just north of the island of Jamaica later that day as it weakened back into a tropical storm. Eventually, the storm turned abruptly northeastward and crossed the eastern tip of Cuba. By November 3, it had emerged into the Atlantic and entered the southern Bahamas. Beginning to accelerate, the tropical storm passed to the west of Bermuda before becoming extratropical on November 6.

At Grand Cayman, winds from the storm reached 92 mph (148 km/h) with a minimum pressure of 990 mbar (29 inHg). According to press reports, the hurricane inflicted considerable damage on the Cayman Islands. In northern Jamaica, property damage was also widespread. The hurricane brought heavy rainfall, high winds, and pounding surf to the island, leaving one dead. Another death was reported in Cuba, where the torrential rains also caused extensive flooding and losses to livestock and crops.

=== Tropical depressions ===
In addition to the six systems reaching at least tropical storm intensity, there were four cyclones that remained a tropical depression. A tropical wave developed into a tropical depression over the eastern Gulf of Mexico just offshore Florida on July 7. The depression moved generally westward and struck southern Texas on July 11 and dissipated on the following day. Houston observed a sustained wind speed of 46 mph (74 km/h). However, no weather stations farther south observed tropical storm-force winds, while the wind speed recorded in Houston may have been associated with a squall line in advance of a frontal system. Thus, the Atlantic hurricane reanalysis project did not retroactively upgrade the depression to a tropical storm.

On August 19, a disturbance that may have detached from Tropical Storm Five developed into a tropical depression. However, the depression was soon absorbed by a frontal system. Another depression formed from a tropical wave near Bermuda on August 25. The cyclone moved northeastward for a few days, before transitioning into an extratropical cyclone on August 28 and then being absorbed by a frontal system. Early on September 30, another tropical depression developed over the central Atlantic. The depression initially moved southeastward and later curved to the south before degenerating into a tropical wave on October 3.

== See also ==
- 1900–1950 South-West Indian Ocean cyclone seasons – Cyclone season in the Southwest Indian Ocean
- 1930s Australian region cyclone seasons
- 1939 Pacific hurricane season
- 1939 Pacific typhoon season
