= Bernard Doucette =

Franco-American meteorologist

Bernard F. Doucette (August 26, 1895 – April 16, 1974) was a Franco-American meteorologist, whose contributions included his observations of the 1939 Pacific typhoon season.

Doucette was born in Wilmington, Massachusetts.

He became one of the scholastics at the Manila Observatory (1925-1927), returning there later (1933-1974). After the Japanese invasion of the Philippines, he was held in Santo Tomas Internment Camp. Doucette died in Manila in 1974.
