= 1939 Pacific hurricane season =

Seasonal boundaries
- First system formed: June 12, 1939
- Last system dissipated: October 25, 1939

Strongest storm
- Name: Ten
  - Lowest pressure: 930 mbar (hPa; 27.46 inHg)

Seasonal statistics
- Total storms: 10
- Hurricanes: 4
- Total fatalities: 93
- Total damage: $2 million (1939 USD)

Related articles
- 1939 Atlantic hurricane season; 1939 Pacific typhoon season; 1930s North Indian Ocean cyclone seasons

The 1939 Pacific hurricane season ran through the summer and fall of 1939. Before the satellite age started in the 1960s, data on east Pacific hurricanes was extremely unreliable. Most east Pacific storms were of no threat to land. However, 1939 saw a large number of storms threaten California.

== Systems ==
=== Hurricane One ===
On June 12, a hurricane was detected. The lowest pressure reported by a ship was 985 mbar (29.1 inHg). The hurricane was last seen June 13.

=== Possible Tropical Cyclone Two ===
A possible tropical cyclone was located off the coast of Mexico on June 27. A ship reported a gale and a pressure of 1,006 mbar (29.7 inHg). The system was last seen on June 28.

=== Tropical Cyclone Three ===
On July 19, a tropical cyclone was detected. A ship reported a pressure of 1,000.7 millibars (29.55 inHg).

=== Tropical Cyclone Four ===
On July 29, a tropical cyclone was located midway between Manzanillo and Acapulco. It moved up the coast, and a ship reported a pressure of 1,000 mbar (30 inHg) on July 29 as the cyclone made landfall in the vicinity of Manzanillo.

=== Tropical Cyclone Five ===
A small tropical cyclone was detected on August 31. A ship reported gales and a pressure of 1,003.3 millibars (29.63 inHg).

=== Hurricane Six ===
A storm developed southwest of Cabo San Lucas on September 4 and paralleled the western coast of the Baja California Peninsula for two days, eventually curving northeast into the northern Baja California on September 6. From September 4 to 7, moisture from the storm and its remnants brought heavy rain to Southern California. The storm delivered over a year's worth of rainfall to Blythe, while Imperial received more than two years' worth. The flooding caused major damage in Mecca, California, and 3 feet (0.91 m) of water swamped Thermal. Unusually heavy rains spread across the Colorado River Valley to western Arizona ahead of an approaching shortwave trough, with a maximum of 6.85 in (174 mm) falling in Truxton, Arizona. Across the state, seven stations set 24-hour rainfall records between September 4–6, while the storm's rains would contribute to the rainiest September at 38 stations.

=== Hurricane Seven ===
A tropical cyclone was first detected south of Acapulco on September 5. It intensified into a hurricane and moved northwestward. A ship sailing through the eye reported a pressure reading of 948 mbar (28.0 inHg). The tropical cyclone made landfall somewhere along the Baja California Peninsula. It dissipated inland over the northern part of the peninsula on September 12. Remnants of this tropical storm, in association with a trough, caused rain of up to 4 inches (100 mm) in southern California on September 11 and 12.

=== Tropical Cyclone Eight ===
On September 5, a tropical cyclone formed off the coast of Costa Rica. It also headed northwest and dissipated over the southern part of Baja California on September 15. The lowest reported pressure was 1,004 mbar (29.6 inHg). From September 19 to 21, remnants of this tropical cyclone caused rain measuring up to 3 inches (76 mm) in Southern California.

=== Hurricane Nine ===
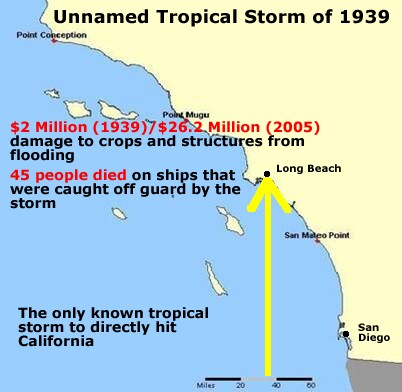
Map showing effects of Hurricane Nine on California

On September 14, a tropical cyclone formed off the coast of Central America. This tropical storm tracked northwestward and intensified into a hurricane. The sea-level pressure dropped to 975 mbar (28.8 inHg) or lower. The hurricane recurved gradually to the northeast and weakened over cool seas. On September 25, this tropical storm made landfall near Long Beach, California, and dissipated inland.

The tropical storm caught Southern Californians unprepared. It brought heavy rain and flooding to the area, which killed 45 people. At sea, 48 were killed. The storm caused heavy property damage amounting to $2 million (1939 USD) in total, mostly to crops and coastal infrastructure.

=== Hurricane Ten ===
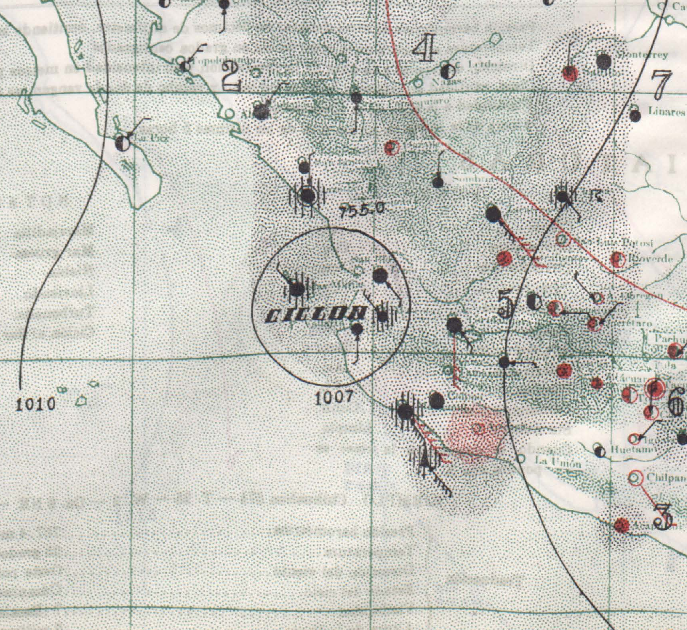
Surface analysis of Hurricane Ten making landfall on October 25

On October 23, a tropical cyclone formed south of Cabo Corrientes, Jalisco. It intensified and headed roughly due north. A steamer, the Nevadan, caught in the eye of this extremely intense hurricane, recording a corrected central pressure of 930 mbar (hPa; 27.46 inHg). Even with modern tropical cyclone observation techniques available, this reading still qualifies this cyclone as one of the most intense on record and would likely have made it a Category 4 or 5 hurricane. The steep pressure gradient between the Nevadan and the external hurricane conditions off of Manzanillo, Colima caused several tarpaulins to burst. Other shipping was disrupted off the Mexican coast by the intense tropical cyclone.

The hurricane made landfall near Cabo Corrientes on October 25 and dissipated shortly thereafter. Onshore, the storm caused an extensive swath of damage. Homes were destroyed in the towns of Santiago Ixcuintla and Rosamorada in the Mexican state of Nayarit, displacing hundreds of people. In Puerto Vallarta, a strong storm surge flooded a section of the town, destroying several homes. Tobacco, corn, and rice crops in the region suffered considerable damage. The strong winds downed power lines, resulting in the delayed dissemination of damage reports. Although no exact casualty total was documented, reports indicated that the tropical cyclone caused a "few casualties". After the storm, US$6,000 was donated to help aid the displaced in the states of Nayarit and Jalisco, while doctors and nurses were sent to those areas.

== See also ==
- 1939 Atlantic hurricane season
- 1939 Pacific typhoon season
- 1930s North Indian Ocean cyclone seasons
- 1900–1940 South Pacific cyclone seasons
- 1900–1950 South-West Indian Ocean cyclone seasons
- 1930s Australian region cyclone seasons
