= 1933 Pacific hurricane season =

Seasonal boundaries
- First system formed: May 30, 1933
- Last system dissipated: October 9, 1933

Strongest storm
- Name: One
  - Lowest pressure: 997 mbar (hPa; 29.44 inHg)

Seasonal statistics
- Total storms: 7
- Hurricanes: 1
- Total fatalities: Unknown
- Total damage: Unknown

Related articles
- 1933 Atlantic hurricane season; 1933 Pacific typhoon season; 1930s North Indian Ocean cyclone seasons

The 1933 Pacific hurricane season ran through the summer and fall of 1933. Before the satellite age started in the 1960s, data on east Pacific hurricanes was extremely unreliable. Most east Pacific storms were of no threat to land.

== Systems ==
=== Tropical Cyclone One ===
On May 30, a tropical cyclone existed in the Gulf of Tehuantepec. Shortly after its discovery, it dissipated off the coast of Guatemala. A ship reported gales and a pressure of 29.44 inHg (99.7 kPa).

=== Possible Tropical Cyclone Two ===
Sometime in June, a possible tropical cyclone existed south of the Mexican coast.

=== Possible Tropical Cyclone Three ===
A possible tropical cyclone was reported between Salina Cruz and Acapulco July 7. It had moved closer to Acapulco by July 8. This system might have been associated with the remnants of the Atlantic's second tropical cyclone.

=== Possible Tropical Cyclone Four ===
Another possible tropical cyclone existed in the same area on July 29.

=== Tropical Storm Five ===
A tropical cyclone formed in the Gulf of Tehuantepec on August. It moved along the coast, becoming at least a tropical storm, and dissipated in the Gulf of California on August 19 or 20. A ship reported an uncorrected barometer reading of 29.48 inHg (99.8 kPa).

=== Possible Tropical Cyclone Six ===
A possible tropical cyclone existed on September 13. It was located well west of Manzanillo.

=== Hurricane Seven ===
A "tropical hurricane" was tracked well northeast of Hawaii between October 7 and 9.

== See also ==
- 1933 Atlantic hurricane season
- 1933 Pacific typhoon season
- 1930s North Indian Ocean cyclone seasons
- 1900–1940 South Pacific cyclone seasons
- 1900–1950 South-West Indian Ocean cyclone seasons
- 1930s Australian region cyclone seasons
