= 1936 Atlantic hurricane season =

- Season summary map

Seasonal boundaries
- First system formed: June 12, 1936
- Last system dissipated: December 6, 1936

Strongest storm
- Name: Thirteen
  - Maximum winds: 120 mph (195 km/h) (1-minute sustained)
  - Lowest pressure: 962 mbar (hPa; 28.41 inHg)

Seasonal statistics
- Total depressions: 20
- Total storms: 17
- Hurricanes: 7
- Major hurricanes (Cat. 3+): 1
- Total fatalities: 5 total
- Total damage: ~ $1.23 million (1936 USD)

Related articles
- 1936 Pacific hurricane season; 1936 Pacific typhoon season; 1930s North Indian Ocean cyclone seasons

The 1936 Atlantic hurricane season was a fairly active season, with 20 tropical cyclones recorded, 17 of which became tropical storms was tied with 2017. Seven storms became hurricanes, of which one became a major hurricane. In addition, the season was unusual in the fact that no storms moved across large portions of the Caribbean Sea. Seven storms, including three hurricanes, struck the United States.

The season's activity was reflected with an accumulated cyclone energy (ACE) rating of 100 units, slightly higher than the 1931–1943 average of 91.2. ACE is a metric used to express the energy used by a tropical cyclone during its lifetime. Therefore, a storm with a longer duration will have high values of ACE. It is only calculated at six-hour increments in which specific tropical and subtropical systems are either at or above sustained wind speeds of 39 mph (63 km/h), which is the threshold for tropical storm intensity. Thus, tropical depressions are not included in the calculations.

== Systems ==
=== Tropical Storm One ===
- Tropical storm (SSHWS)
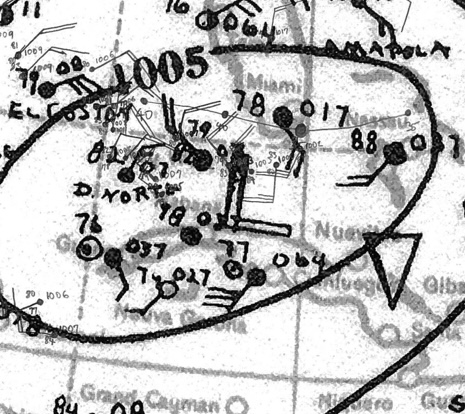
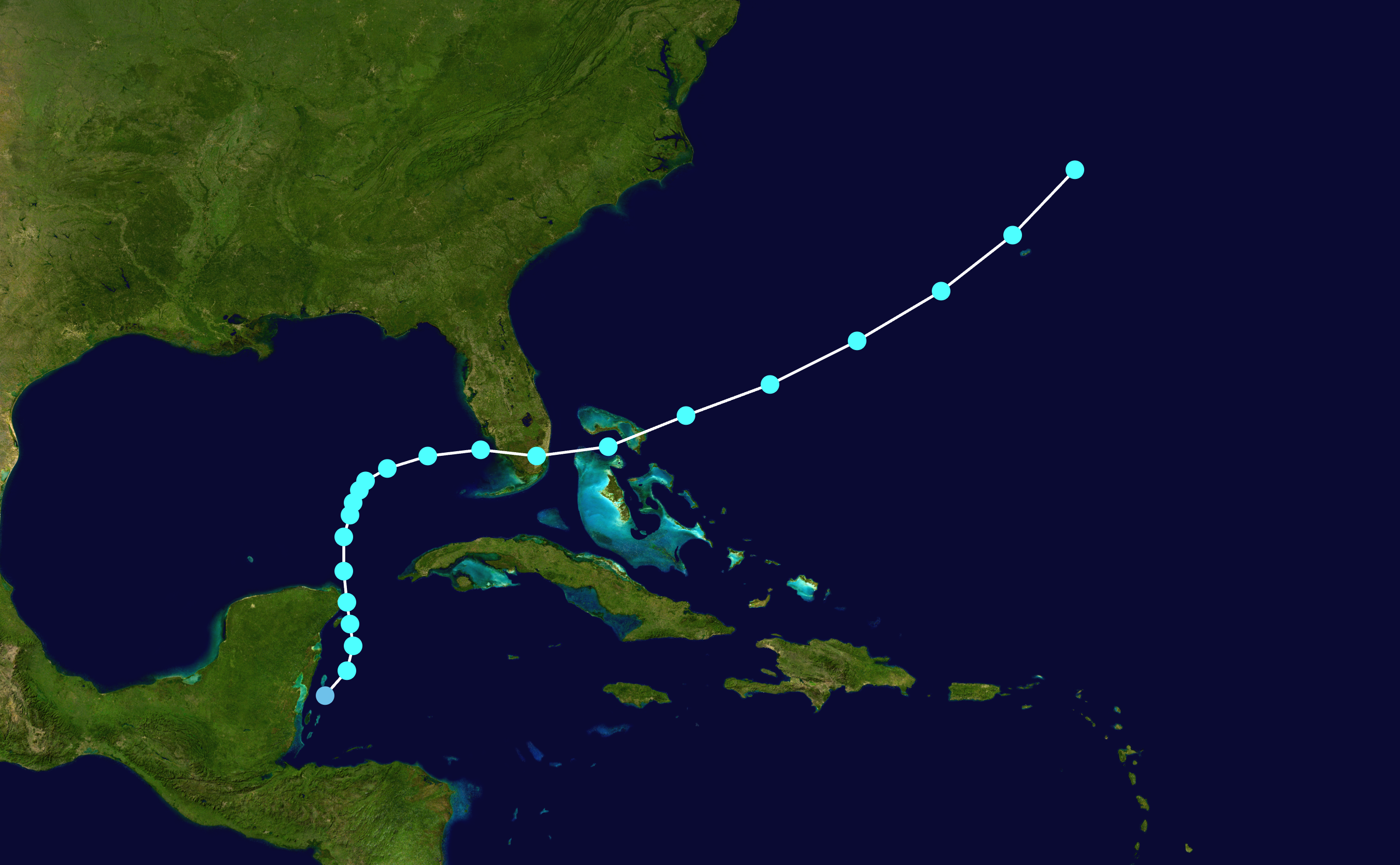
- Duration: June 12 – June 17
- Peak intensity: 45 mph (75 km/h) (1-min); 996 mbar (hPa)

On June 9, a tropical cyclone with atmospheric pressure below 988 mb (29.18 inHg) made landfall on the Pacific coast of Guatemala. It moved northeastward across Central America, but dissipated before reaching the western Caribbean Sea on June 12. The storm quickly re-organized, and again developed into a tropical storm on June 12. It moved north-northeastward, resulting in light winds as it paralleled the eastern coasts of Belize and the Yucatán Peninsula. After reaching the Gulf of Mexico with peak winds of 45 mph (75 km/h), the storm turned to the northeast, then to the east. On June 15, the tropical storm made landfall about 20 mi (32 km) to the south of Fort Myers, Florida, and after crossing the state it passed over Miami before entering the Atlantic Ocean. It weakened as it accelerated northeastward through the Bahamas, and on June 17 the system dissipated to the north of Bermuda.

While crossing Central America, the storm produced heavy rainfall.. In southern Florida, winds from the storm ranged from 30 mph (48 km/h) to a peak of 39 mph (63 km/h) in Miami. The storm produced heavy rainfall in southern Florida, ranging from 8 to 15 in (200 to 380 mm). The rainfall caused flooding of highways and lowlands, drowned several livestock, and some damage. The storm caused three indirect deaths when a Coast Guard airplane crashed in Tampa Bay while in search of small boats.

=== Tropical Storm Two ===
- Tropical storm (SSHWS)
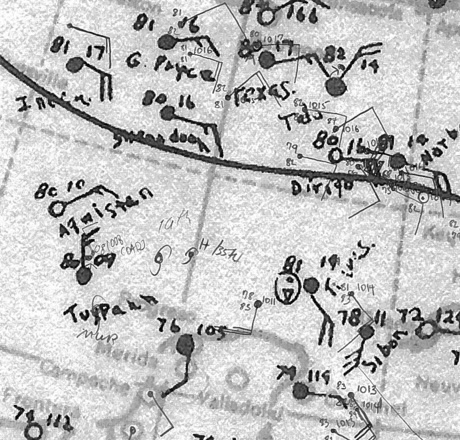
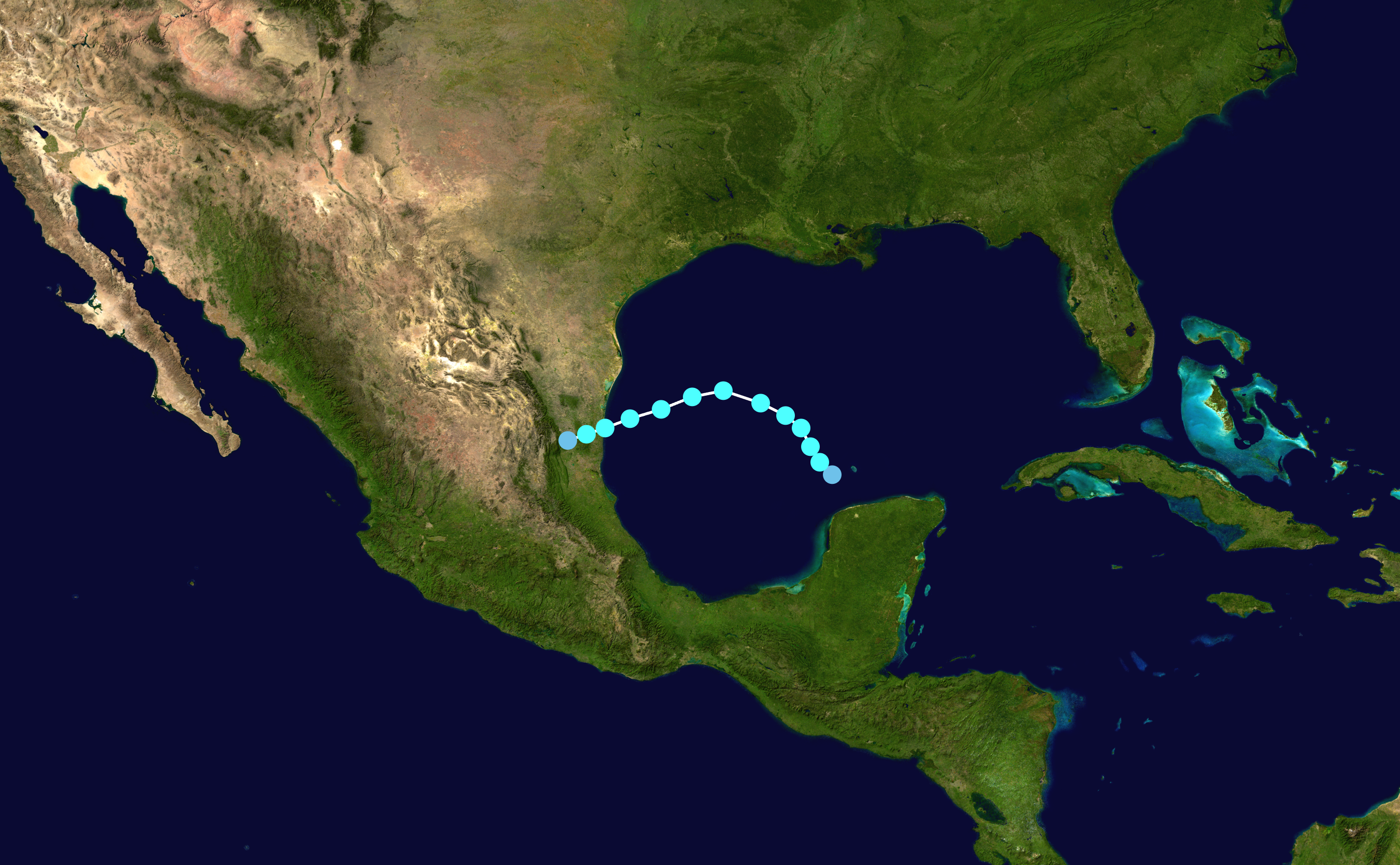
- Duration: June 19 – June 22
- Peak intensity: 50 mph (85 km/h) (1-min); 1000 mbar (hPa)

An area of disturbed weather was first detected near the Yucatán Peninsula on June 18. It tracked west-northwestward, and developed into a tropical storm the following day. The storm continued to the west-northwest until June 21, when the storm turned to the west-southwest. Having remained a minimal tropical storm for all of its lifetime, the 40-mph (65-km/h) storm struck northeast Mexico on June 21, and dissipated the next day. The storm caused higher than normal tides along the Texas coastline, and no damage or deaths were reported.

=== Hurricane Three ===
- Category 1 hurricane (SSHWS)
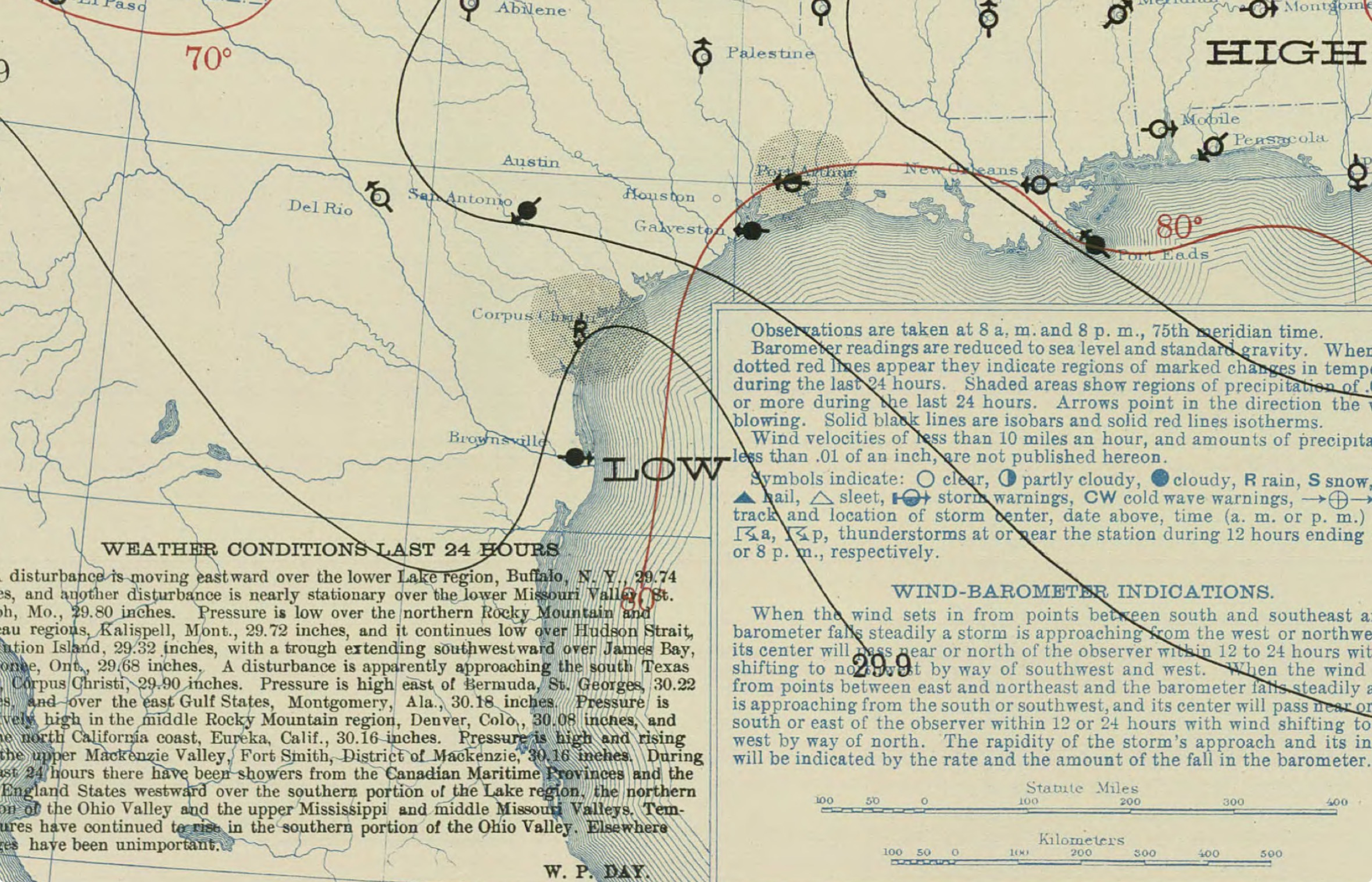
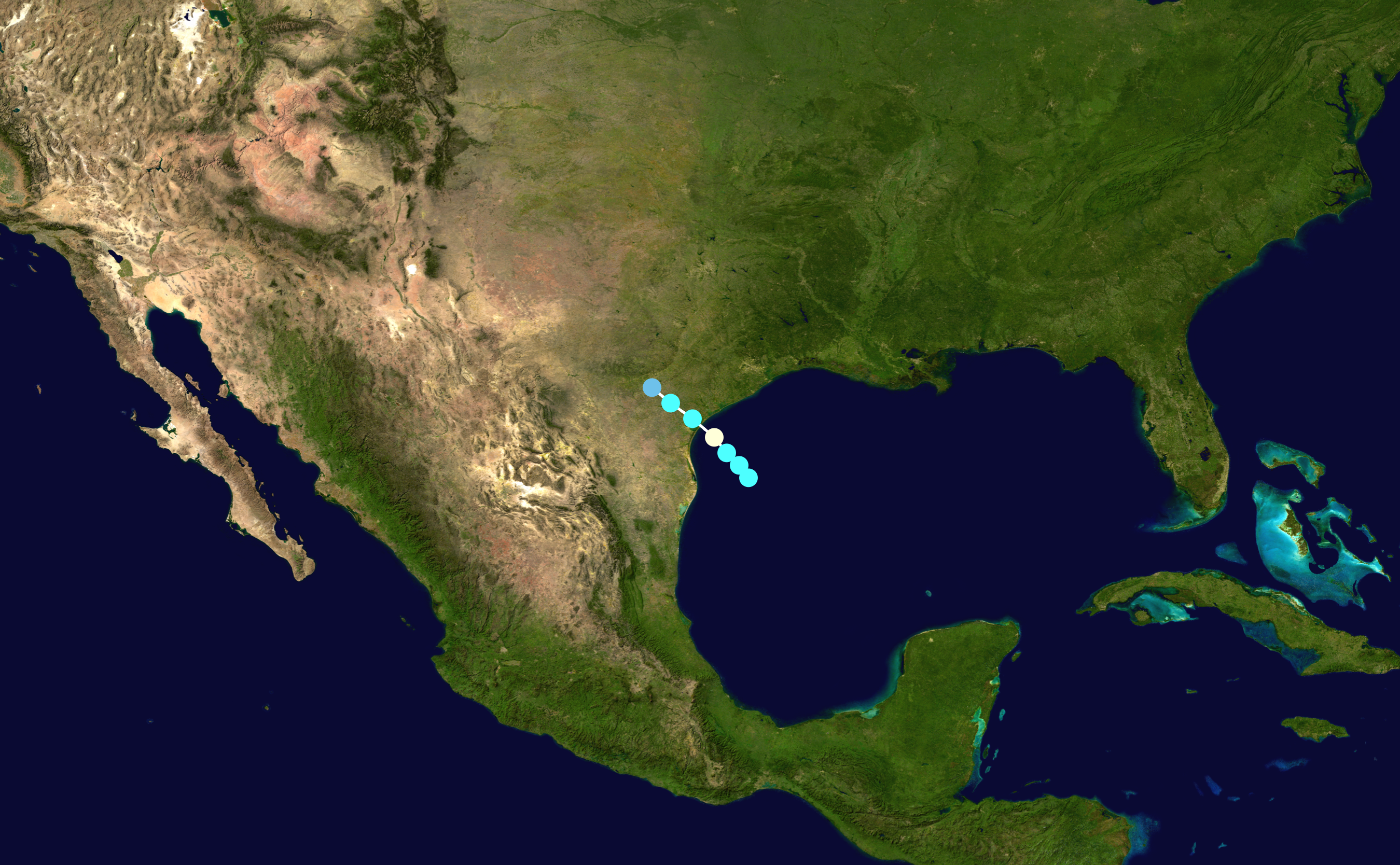
- Duration: June 26 – June 28
- Peak intensity: 80 mph (130 km/h) (1-min); 987 mbar (hPa)

A small tropical storm developed on June 26 while located 125 mi (200 km) east of Brownsville, Texas. It moved northwestward and rapidly strengthened almost immediately after formation (similar to Humberto of 2007), attaining hurricane status with peak winds of 80 mph (130 km/h) by early on June 27. Later on June 27, the hurricane made landfall near Port Aransas with a pressure of 987 mb (29.15 inHg). The storm rapidly weakened over land, and dissipated on June 28 near San Antonio, Texas. A small craft warning was issued for the Corpus Christi area on the morning of the storm making landfall, and the National Weather Bureau issued a hurricane warning just 45 minutes prior to the hurricane striking land.

Upon making landfall, the storm caused a 3.8-ft (1.2-m) storm tide, and many small boats were capsized or driven ashore. The hurricane produced wind gusts of up to 90 mph (140 km/h) in Ingleside and up to 80 mph (130 km/h) in Port Aransas, destroying cooling towers at a local oil refinery and damaging a few houses. Along its path, the storm produced heavy rainfall, though specifics are unknown. Severe crop damage was reported in San Patricio and Nueces Counties. In all, the hurricane caused $550,000 in damage (1936 USD), primarily to oil refinery property, though no deaths or injuries were reported.

=== Tropical Storm Four ===
- Tropical storm (SSHWS)
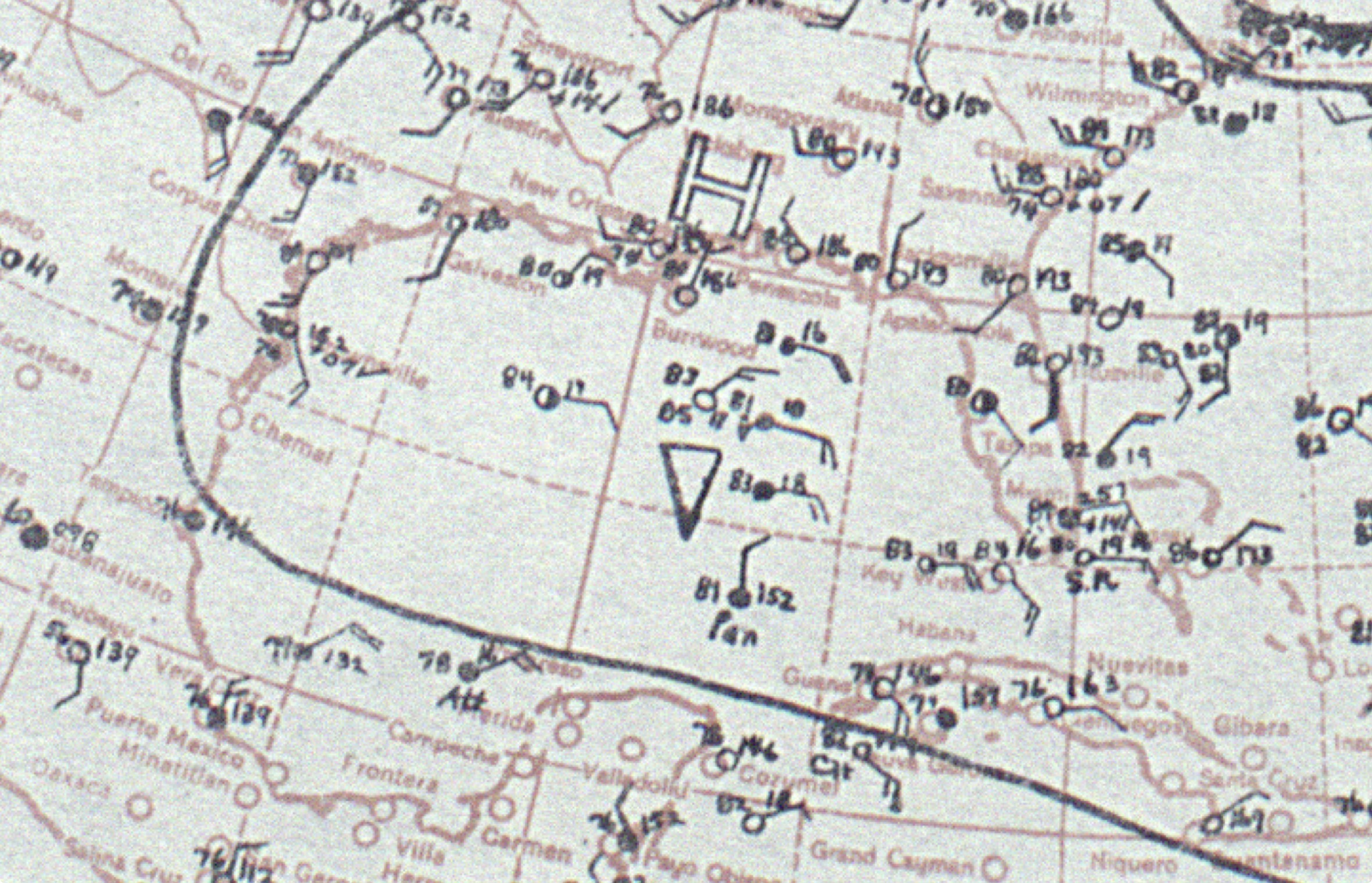
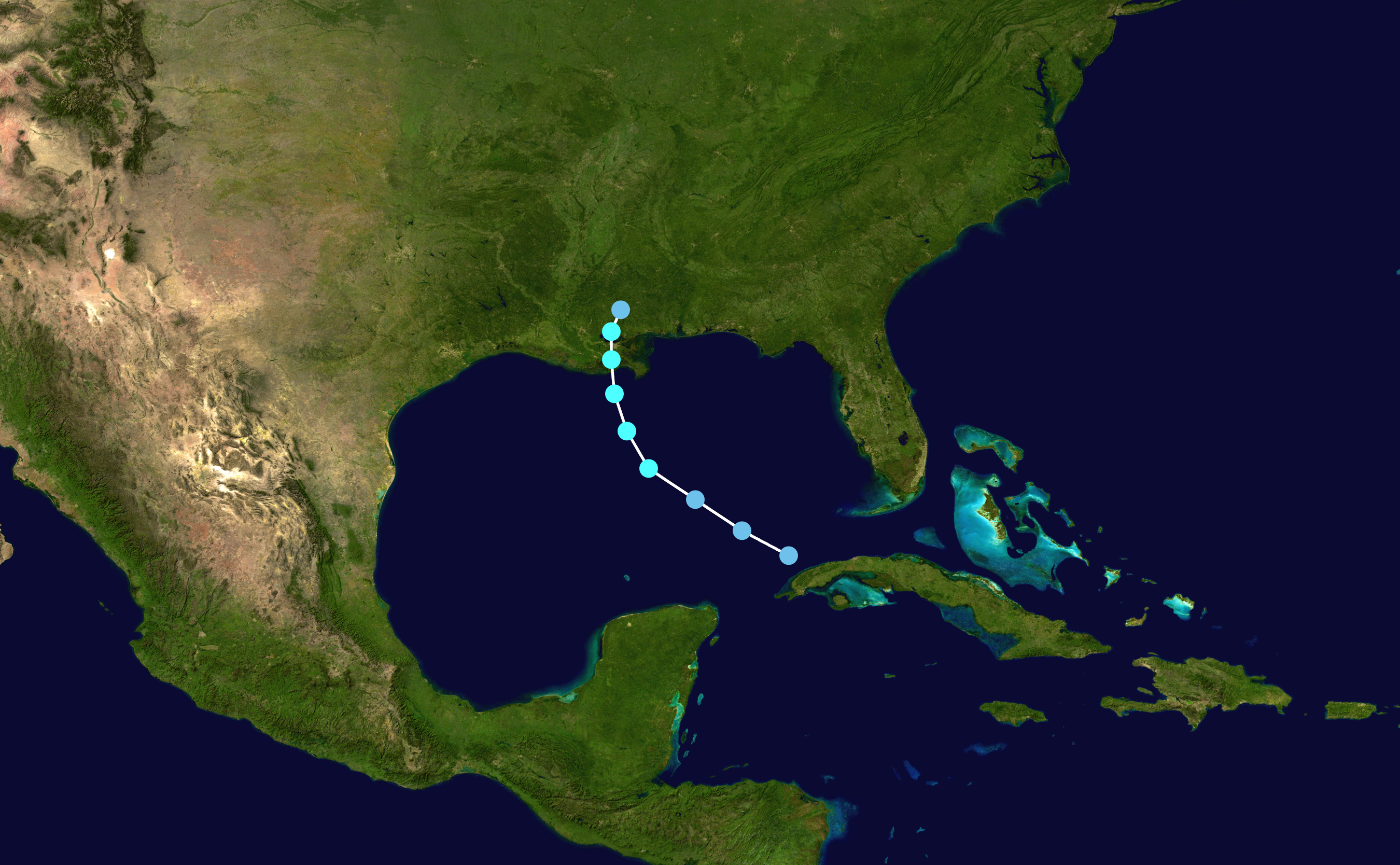
- Duration: July 26 – July 28
- Peak intensity: 45 mph (75 km/h) (1-min); 1003 mbar (hPa)

On July 26, a small tropical storm formed near the western tip of Cuba from a tropical disturbance. It moved quickly northwestward, then turned northward, reaching a peak intensity of 45 mph (75 km/h) that day. On July 27, the storm accelerated northeastward and made landfall on southeastern Louisiana with a pressure of 1003 mbar (hPa; 29.62 inHg). The storm rapidly weakened over land and dissipated later that day. The Weather Bureau office issued a storm warning for the Louisiana coastline, advising those potentially affected to prepare for strong winds and rising tides. However, the storm caused no serious damage, and no casualties are associated with the storm. Wind speeds topped out at 21 mph (34 km/h) in New Orleans, Louisiana.

=== Hurricane Five ===
- Category 2 hurricane (SSHWS)
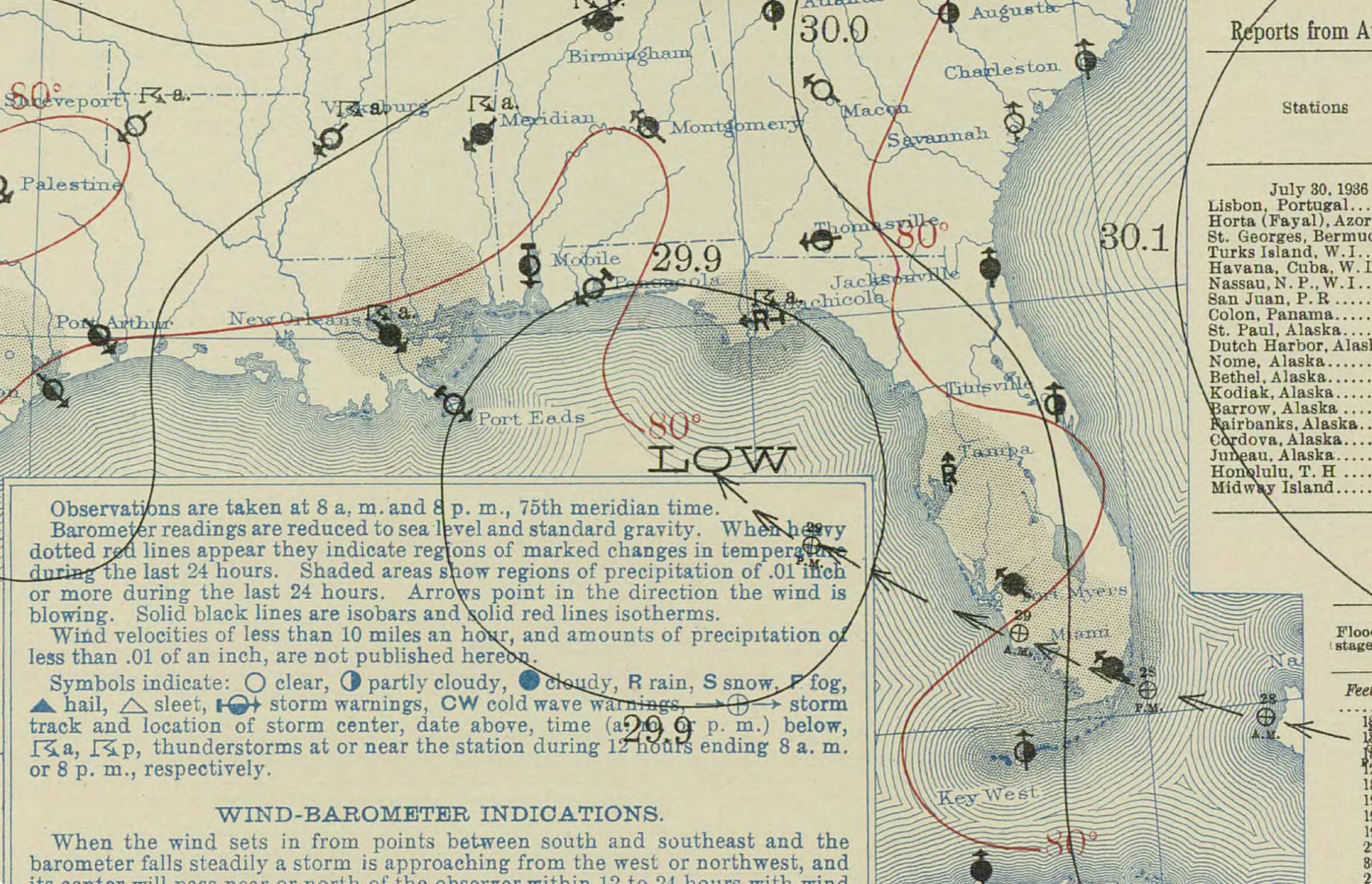
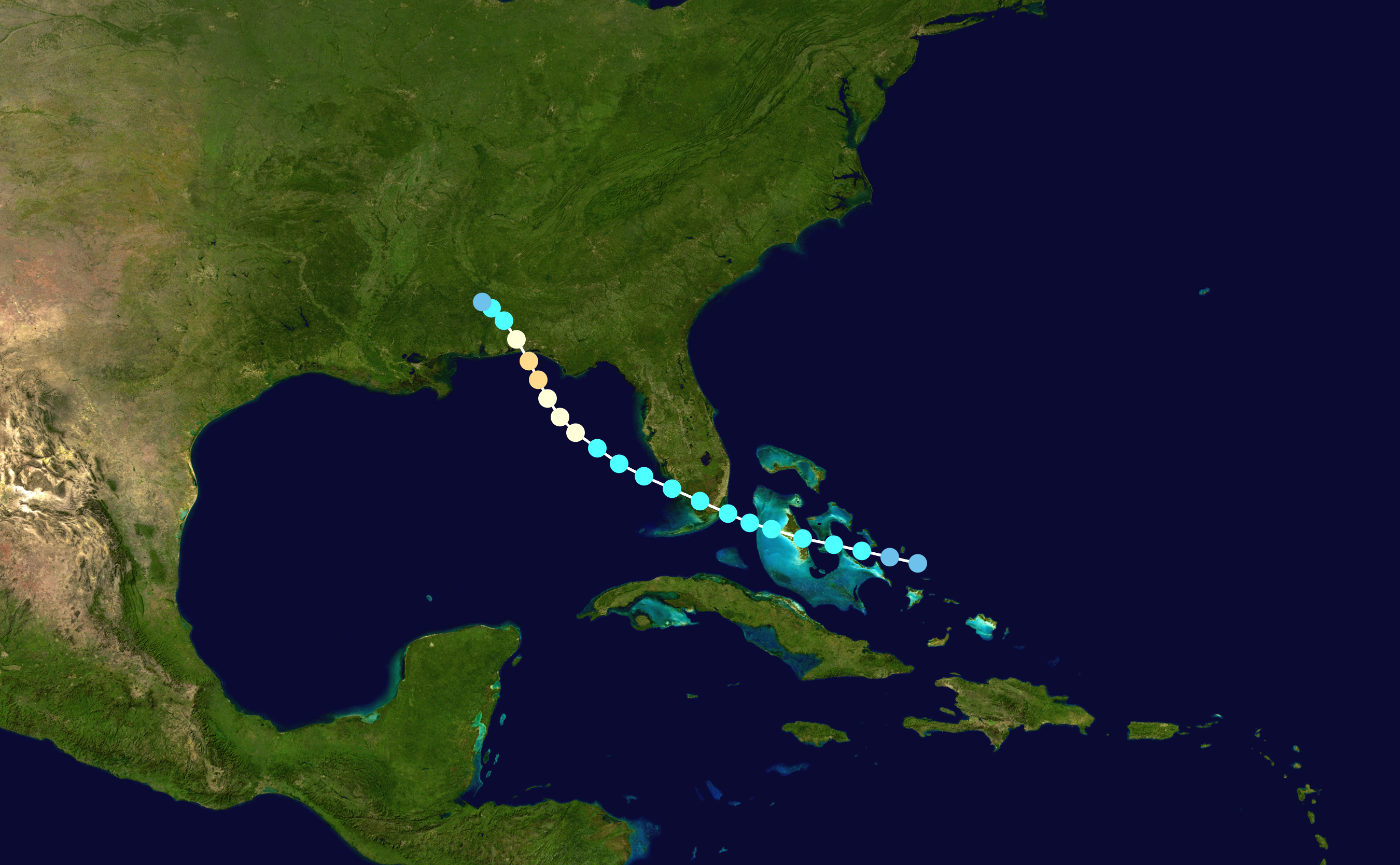
- Duration: July 27 – August 1
- Peak intensity: 105 mph (165 km/h) (1-min); 964 mbar (hPa)

A tropical storm was first observed over the southern Bahamas on July 27. It tracked to the west-northwest, and made landfall a short distance south of Homestead, Florida, with winds of 65 mph (100 km/h). After crossing the state, it intensified over the eastern Gulf of Mexico and became a hurricane on July 30. The hurricane continued to strengthen, and on July 31 hit the western Florida Panhandle near Camp Walton with peak winds of 105 mph (165 km/h). It weakened rapidly over land, and dissipated over western Alabama on August 1.

In south Florida, the storm caused a storm tide of 5.5 ft (1.7 m) when it made landfall, causing flooding of up to 1.5 ft (0.46 m) in coastal areas. Though winds reached 60 mph (95 km/h), damage was minimal there. In Valparaiso in the Florida Panhandle, the hurricane produced wind gusts of up to 100 mph (155 km/h), along with a storm tide of 6 ft (1.8 m). Damage from the storm was relatively minor, totaling to $200,000 (1936 USD). The hurricane indirectly killed four people when a boat capsized in the Gulf of Mexico.

=== Tropical Storm Six ===
- Tropical storm (SSHWS)
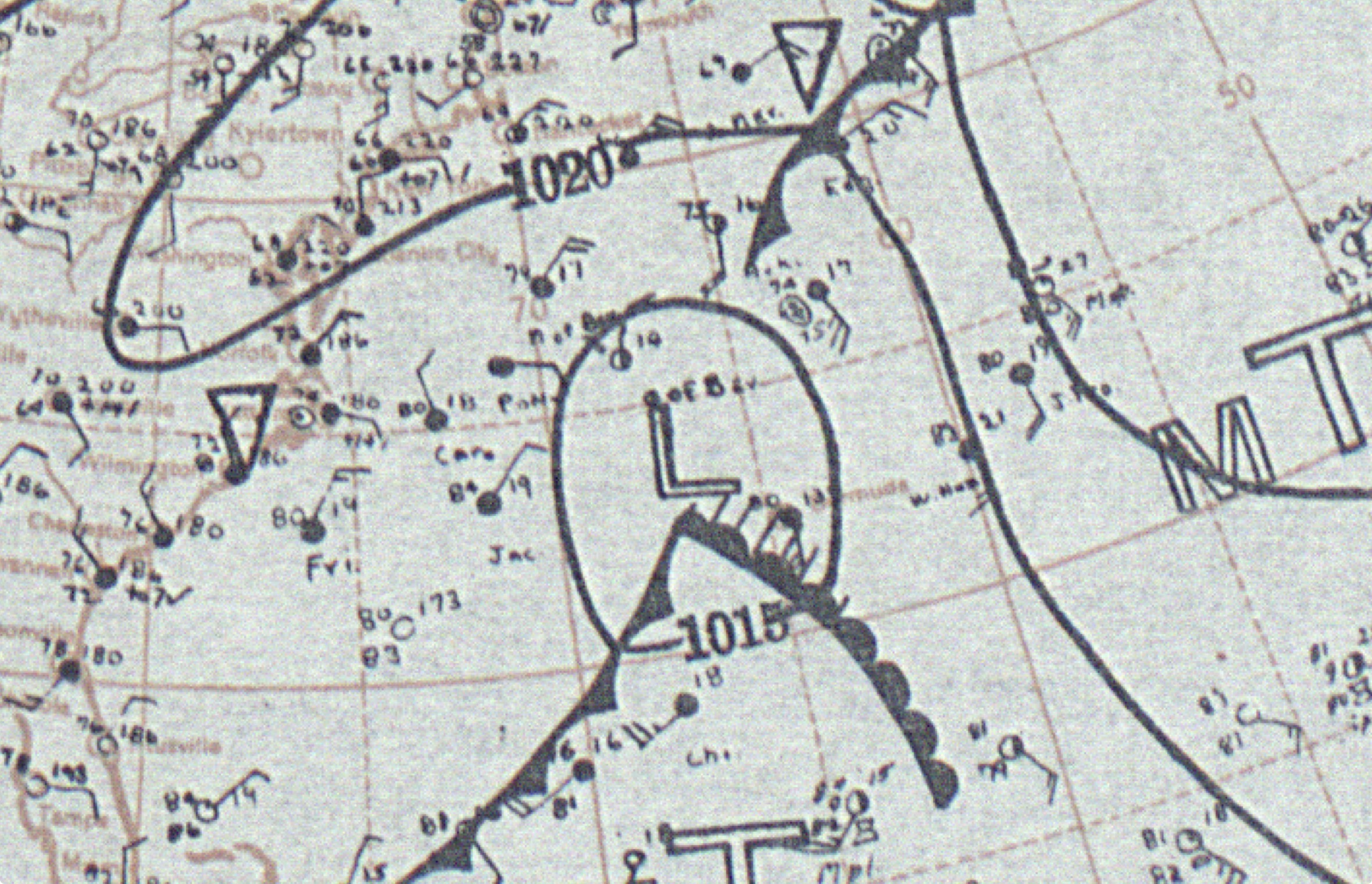
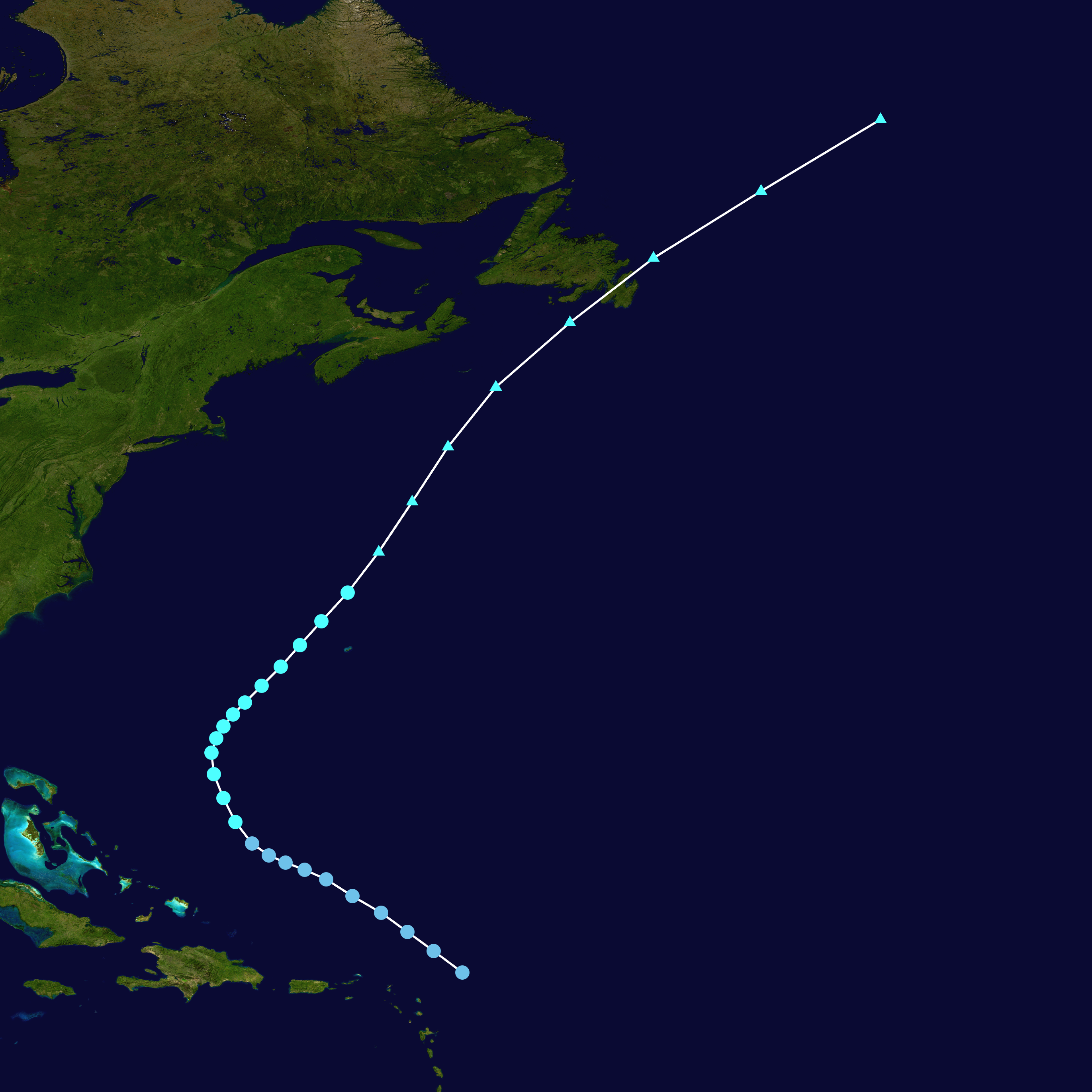
- Duration: August 4 – August 9
- Peak intensity: 40 mph (65 km/h) (1-min); 1001 mbar (hPa)

The sixth tropical storm of the season was first spotted on August 4 while located 155 mi (250 km) east-northeast of Barbuda. It tracked northwestward, and reached a peak intensity of 40 mph (65 km/h) on August 5. It retained that intensity throughout its lifetime (although it is possible it remained a tropical depression but data was conflicting), which was followed by a turn to the northeast on August 8. On August 9, the storm passed 160 mi (255 km) to the west of Bermuda, and early on August 10 the storm became extratropical over the open Atlantic Ocean. The extratropical storm continued northeastward until dissipating late on August 11 while 280 mi (450 km) south of the eastern tip of Nova Scotia.

=== Tropical Storm Seven ===
- Tropical storm (SSHWS)
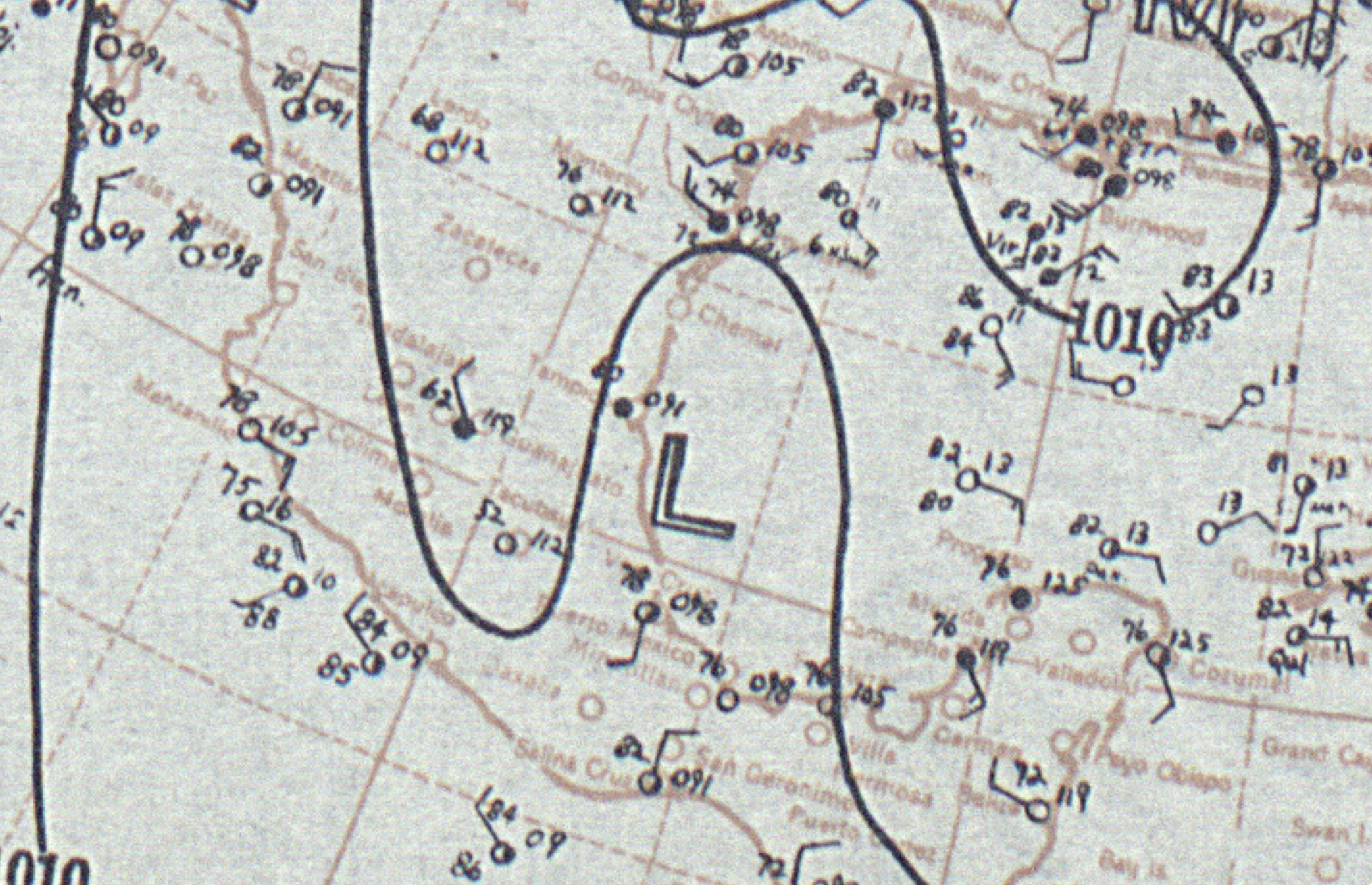
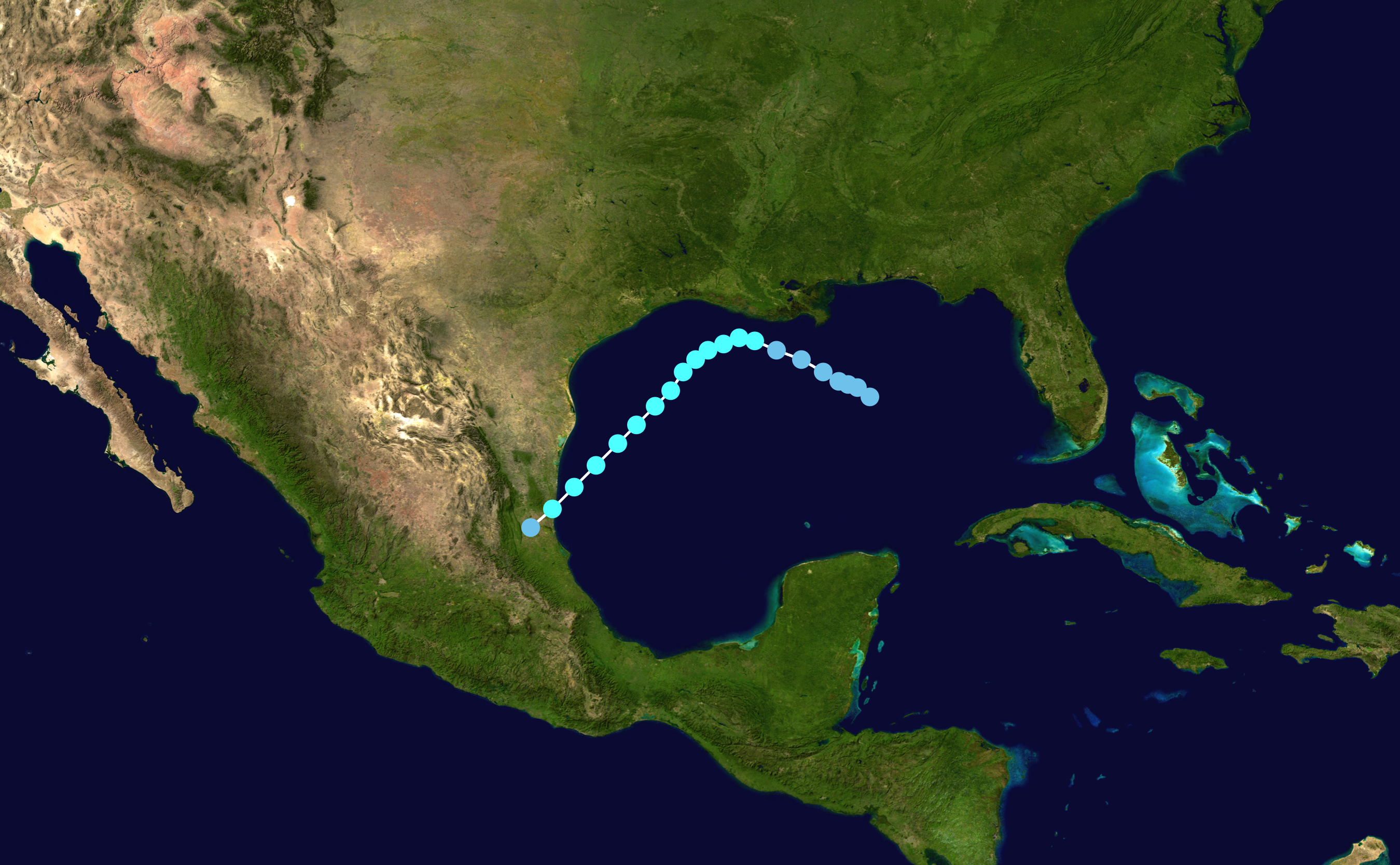
- Duration: August 7 – August 12
- Peak intensity: 40 mph (65 km/h) (1-min); 1008 mbar (hPa)

A weak tropical storm formed on August 7 in the eastern Gulf of Mexico west-northwest of the Dry Tortugas. The system moved northwest towards the northwest Gulf of Mexico through August 9 while maintaining its peak of 40 mph (65 km/h). It is possible it weakened to a tropical depression at times, but there is no data supporting or denying such. The storm then began to curve more to the west-southwest on August 10 while located just south-southwest of Port Eads, Louisiana, while maintaining intensity. The storm continued moving southwest through August 11, weakening to a tropical depression shortly before making landfall near Tampico on August 12. The system weakened quickly after moving inland, and dissipated shortly afterwards.

Advisories were issued early on August 12 from the U.S. Weather Bureau in New Orleans for the system as it neared Mexico shortly before making landfall, but little damage and no deaths were reported in Mexico.

=== Hurricane Eight ===
- Category 1 hurricane (SSHWS)
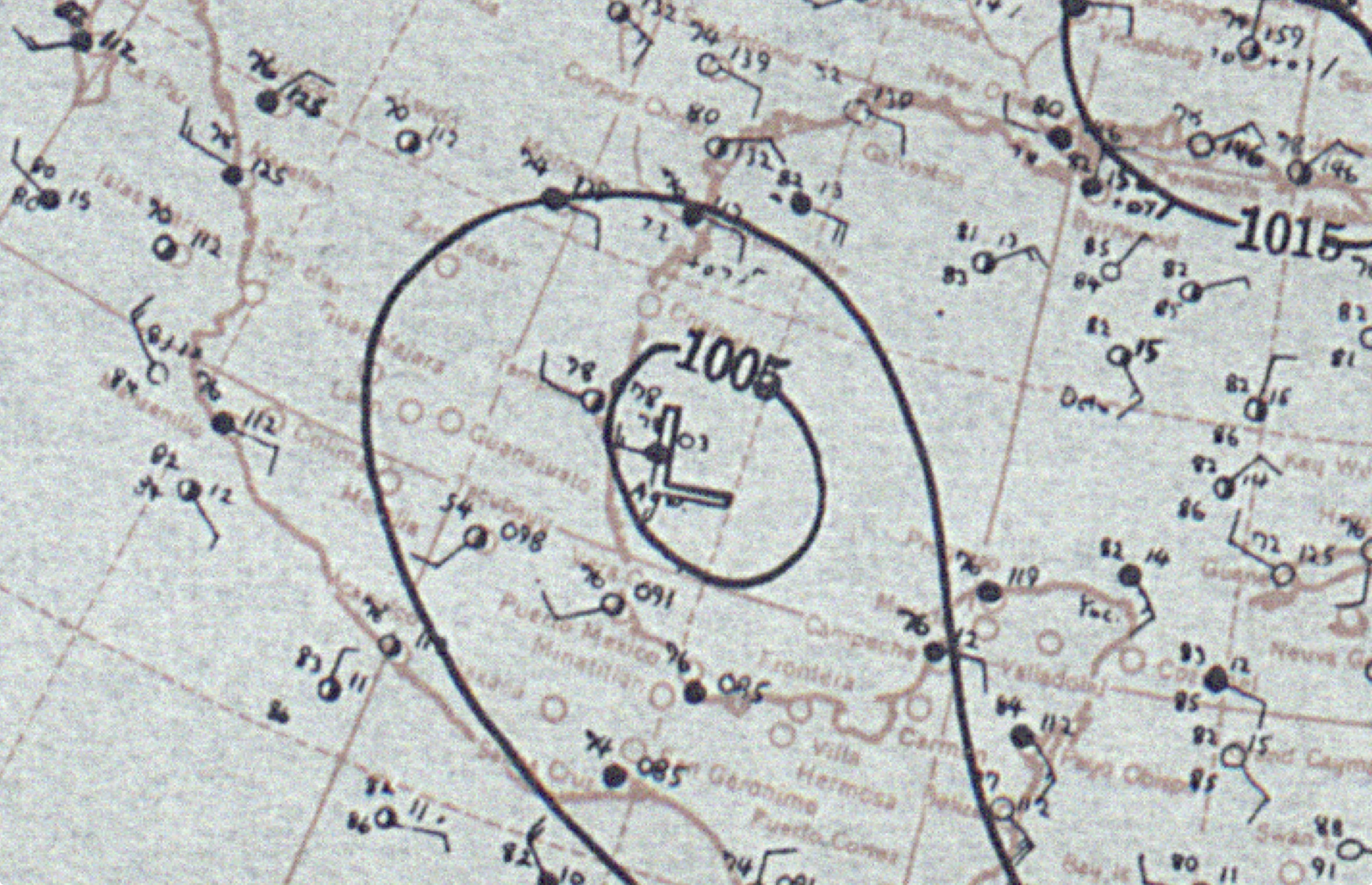
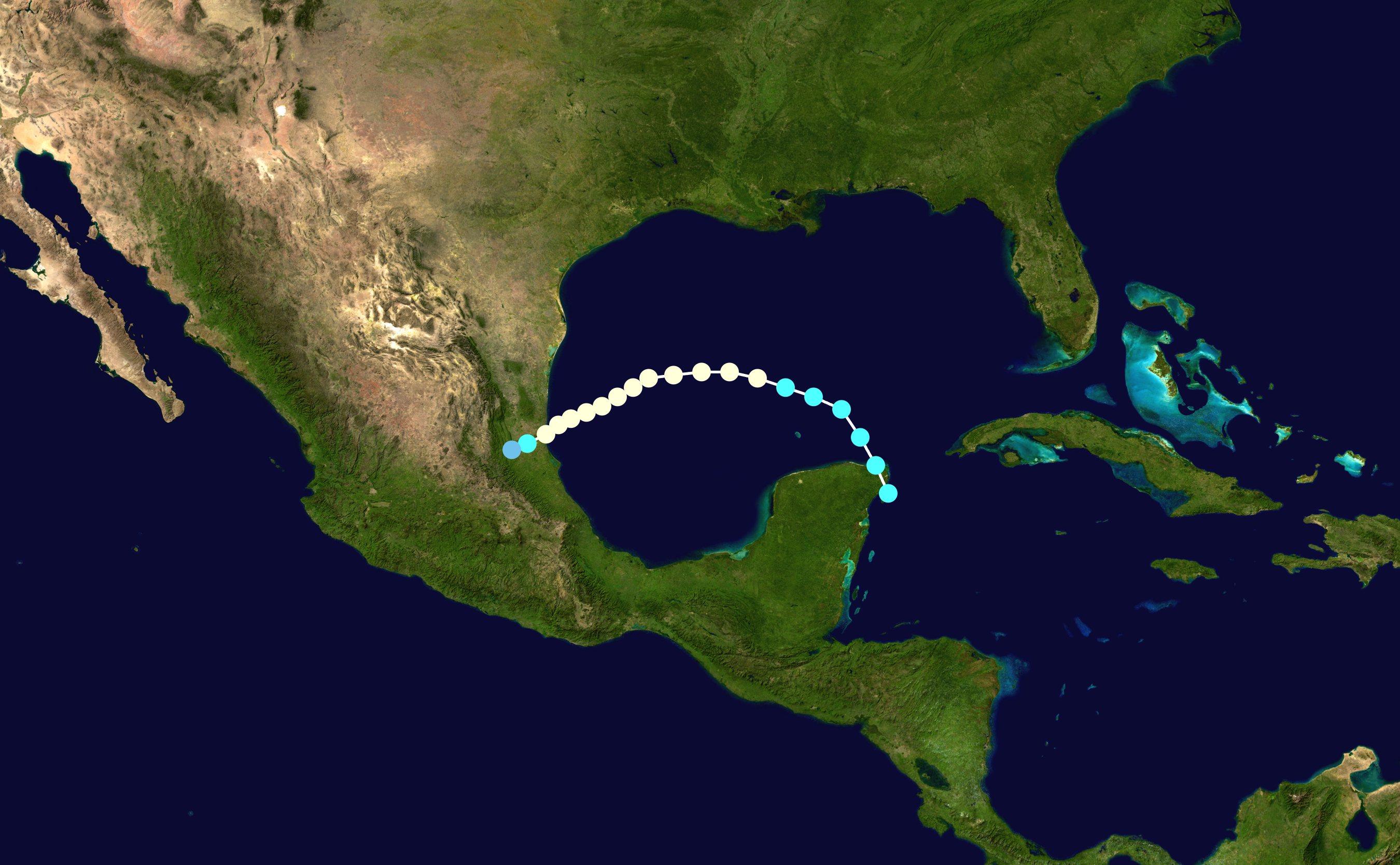
- Duration: August 15 – August 20
- Peak intensity: 75 mph (120 km/h) (1-min); 999 mbar (hPa)

A tropical disturbance was detected in the western to northwest Caribbean Sea near Cancún on August 15. The system moved northwest into the southwest Gulf of Mexico as a tropical storm on August 16 while slowly strengthening. The system reached hurricane intensity as a Category 1 on August 17, and reached its peak of 75 mph (120 km/h) shortly afterwards. The hurricane began to move west-southwest late on August 17 and through August 18, eventually making landfall near Tampico, Tamaulipas, on August 19 as a minimal hurricane or strong tropical storm. The system quickly weakened just after moving inland and dissipated early the next day.

The hurricane brought heavy rains to mainland Mexico, while the highest winds recorded at Tampico were 30 mph (48 km/h) on August 19 as the center passed nearby just to the north. Storm warnings were issued on August 17 and 18 as the system initially approached the upper Gulf Coast of Louisiana and Texas, but the system's west-southwest turn prevented a direct United States landfall.

=== Tropical Storm Nine ===
- Tropical storm (SSHWS)
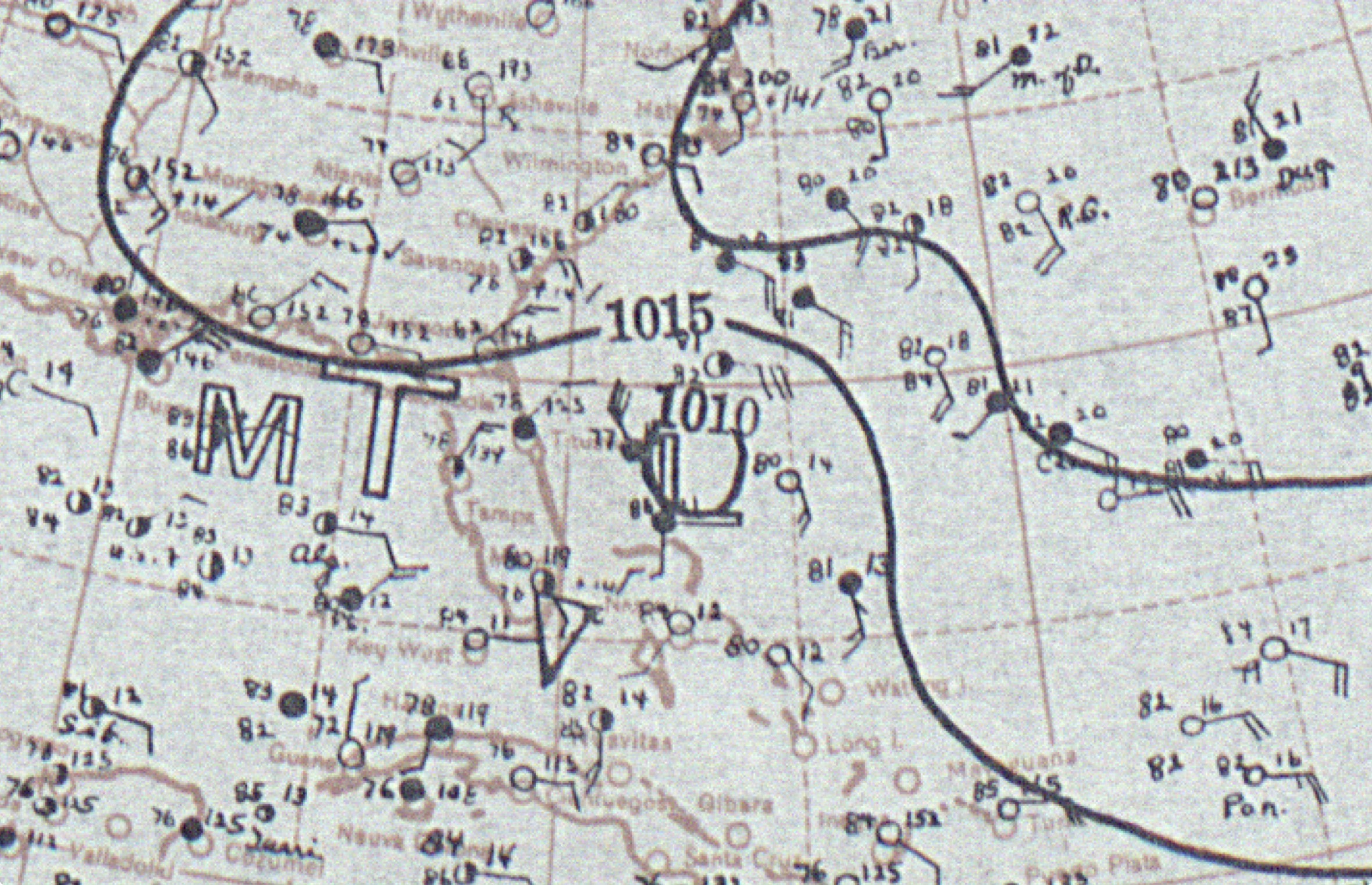
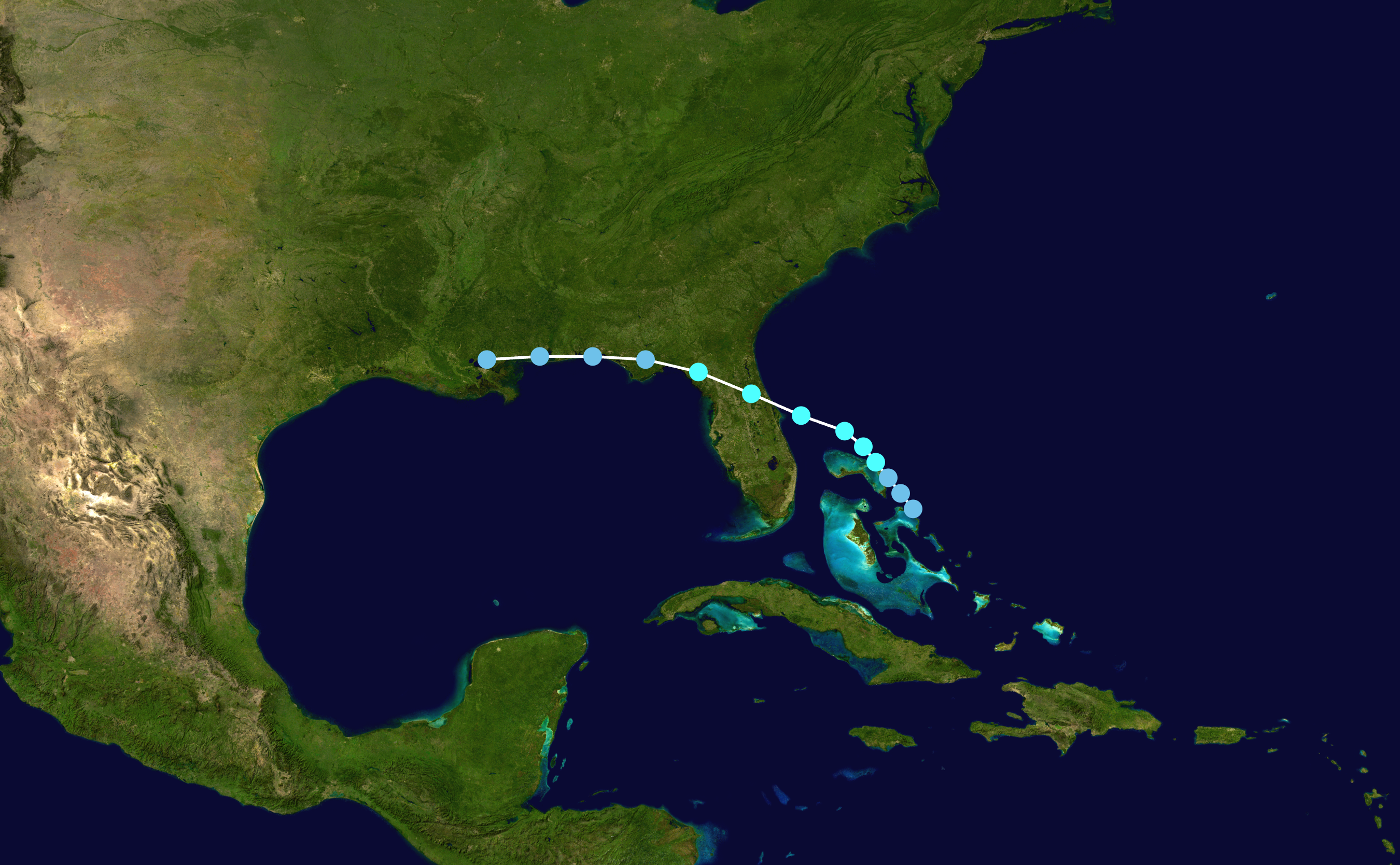
- Duration: August 20 – August 23
- Peak intensity: 60 mph (95 km/h) (1-min); 1002 mbar (hPa)

A weak tropical storm formed on August 20 near the eastern Bahamas. Moving slowly west-northwest through August 21, the system strengthened to its peak of 60 mph (95 km/h) later on August 21, and made landfall on August 22 near Daytona Beach at its peak intensity. The system maintained tropical storm intensity inland while slowly weakening and moving westward, and the storm eventually weakened to a depression on August 23 while entering the eastern Florida Panhandle, and the system dissipated shortly afterwards near as it drifted over eastern Mississippi. The storm caused heavy rains across northern and central Florida, and winds of 40 mph (65 km/h) were recorded near Titusville. Overall damage was minimal.

=== Hurricane Ten ===
- Category 2 hurricane (SSHWS)
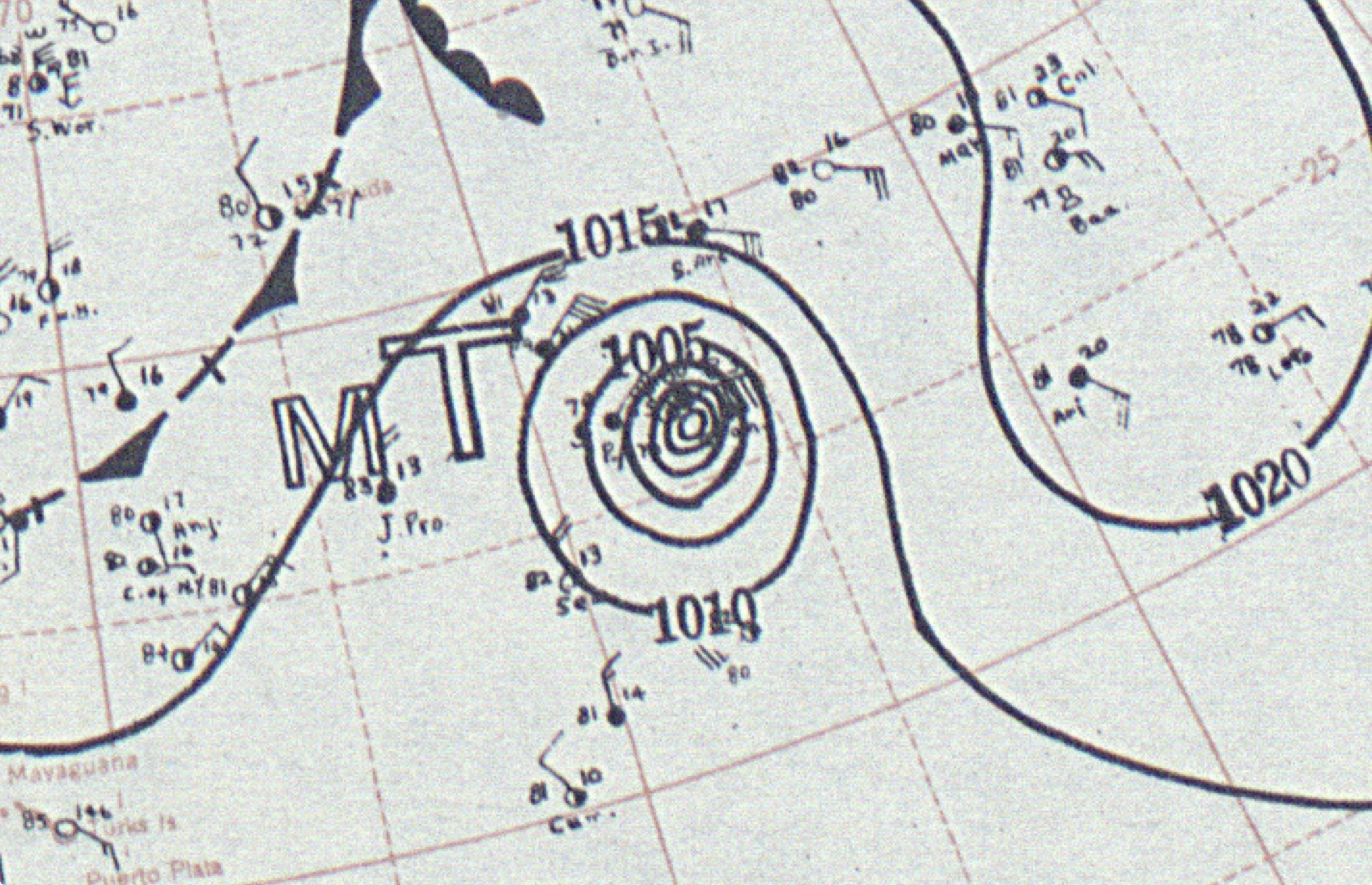
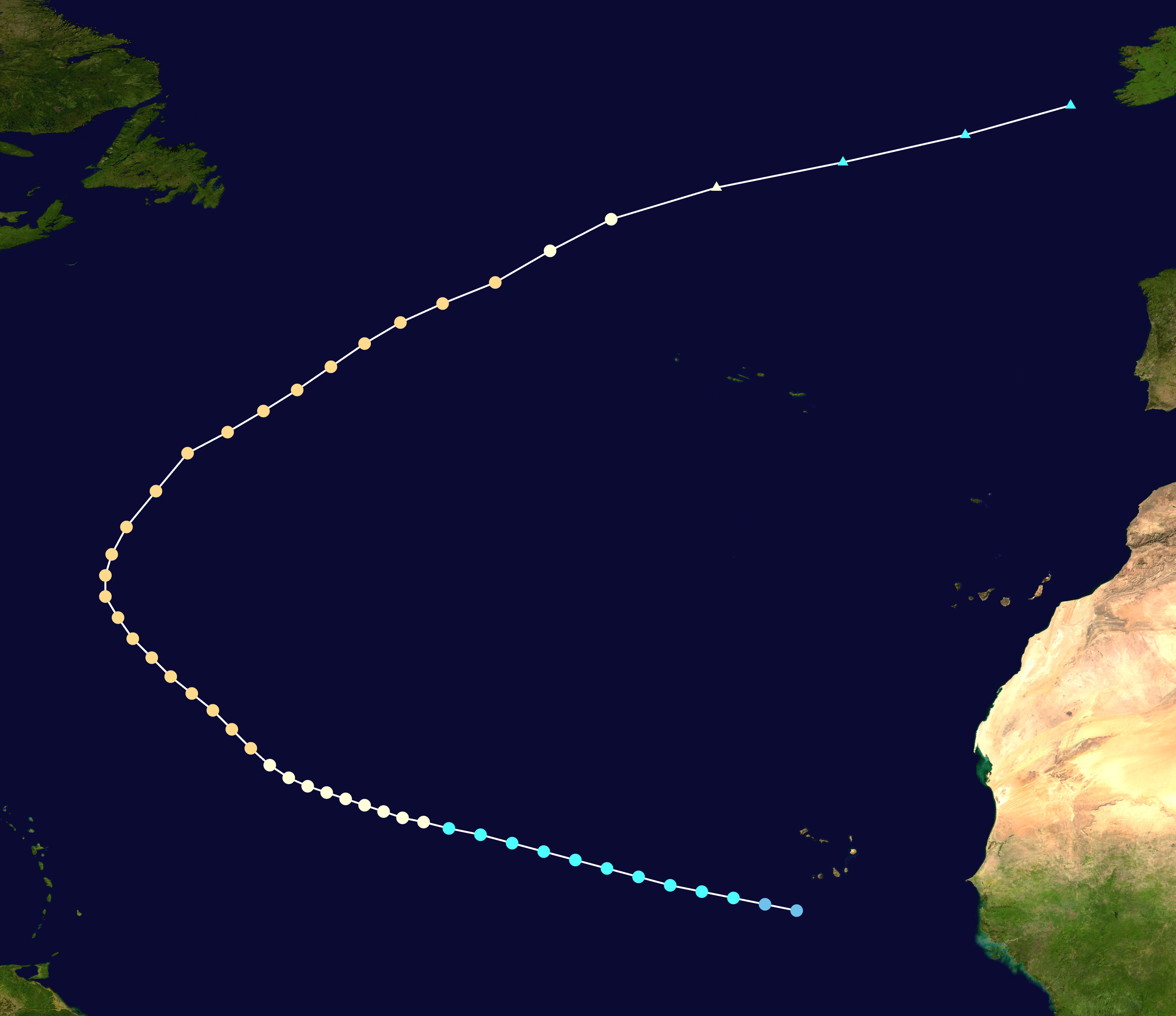
- Duration: August 25 – September 5
- Peak intensity: 110 mph (175 km/h) (1-min); 959 mbar (hPa)

This Cape Verde hurricane was first detected in the eastern tropical Atlantic on August 25. Moving northwest on August 29, the system continued to strengthen, eventually reaching a peak of 110 mph (175 km/h) as a Category 2 hurricane in the central North Atlantic on September 1. The hurricane then began to curve northeast late on September 1 while maintaining intensity, eventually weakening to a 90 mph (140 km/h) Category 1 hurricane on September 5. The system became extratropical on September 6, and the system dissipated while nearing the British Isles. As the system never affected land, no damage or casualties were reported.

=== Hurricane Eleven ===
- Category 1 hurricane (SSHWS)
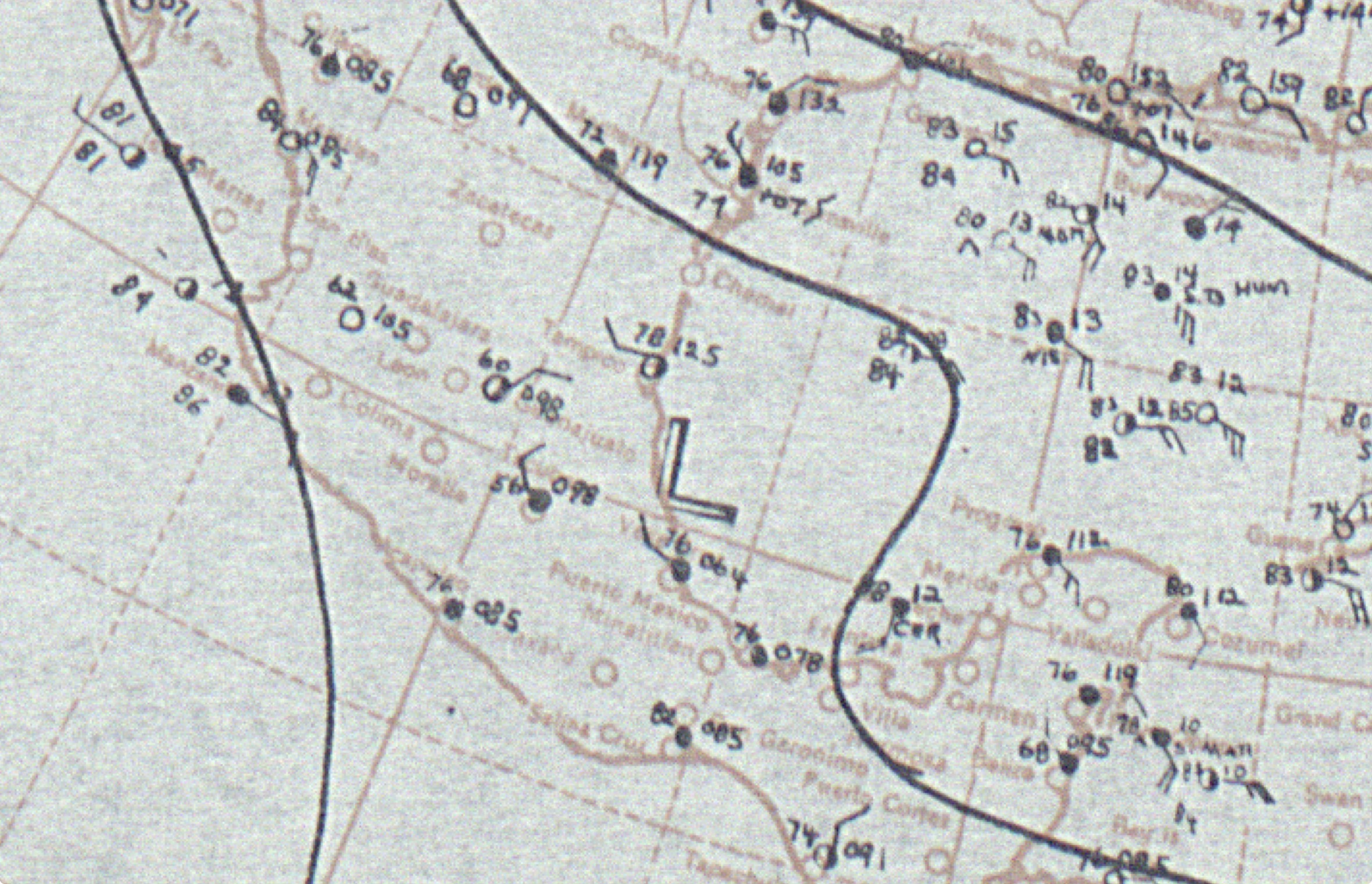
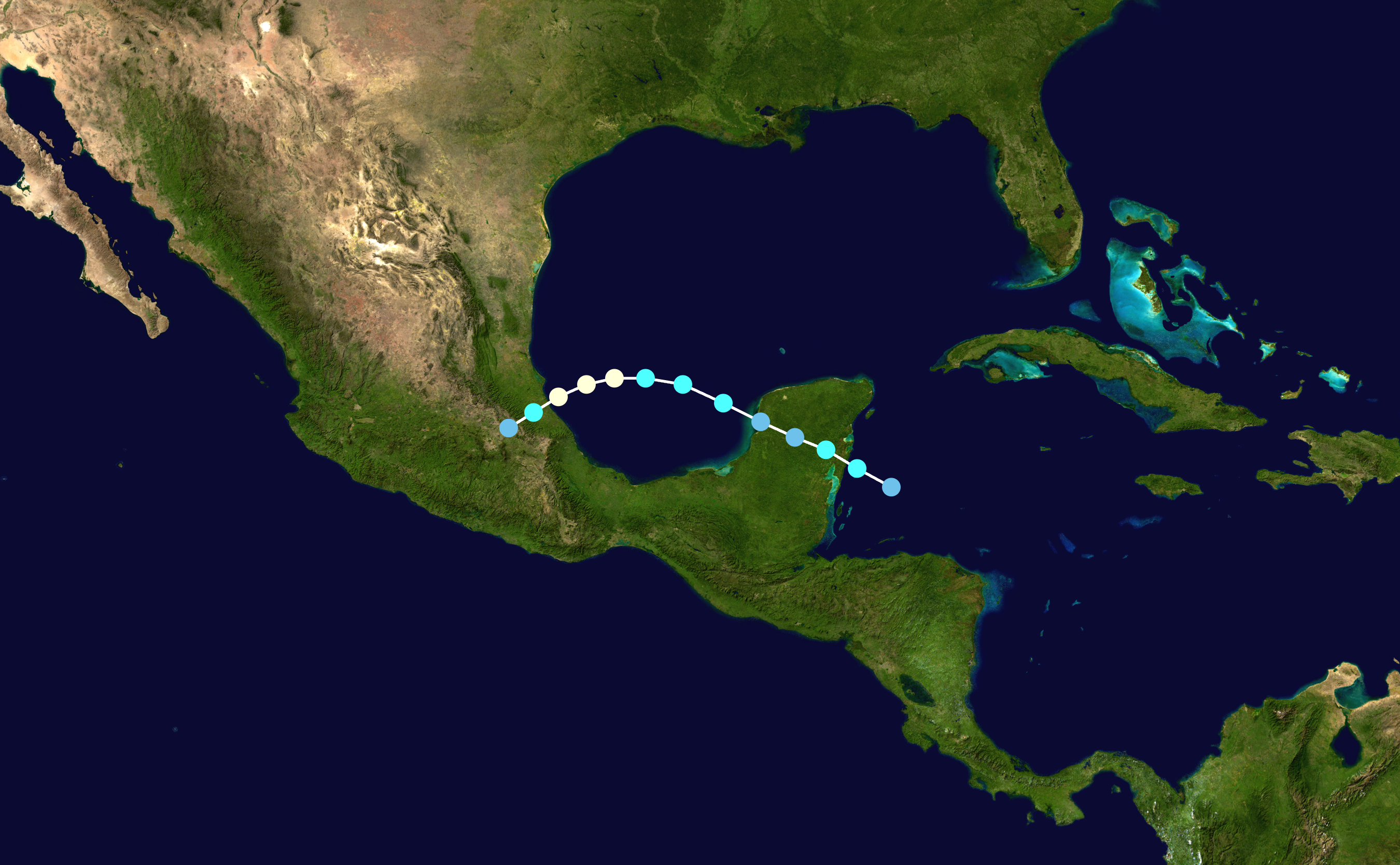
- Duration: August 28 – August 30
- Peak intensity: 80 mph (130 km/h) (1-min); 1000 mbar (hPa)

A tropical storm was detected on August 28 in the far western Caribbean Sea. The system moved steadily west-northwest, making landfall shortly afterwards on the Yucatán Peninsula as a 45 mph (75 km/h) tropical storm. The system weakened slightly to a 40-mph (65-km/h) tropical storm as it steadily crossed the Yucatán, entering the Bay of Campeche late on August 28. The system then began to slow down on August 29 while reintensifying, peaking as an 80-mph (130-km/h) Category 1 shortly afterwards. The hurricane then began to move to the west-southwest, making a final landfall near Tuxpan as a 75-mph (120-km/h) minimal hurricane on August 30. The system quickly weakened to a tropical storm shortly after moving inland, and the weakening storm dissipated shortly afterwards.

Although advisories were issued for Mexico on August 29 and early on August 30 from the U.S. Weather Bureau in New Orleans, little overall damage was reported in mainland Mexico.

=== Tropical Storm Twelve ===
- Tropical storm (SSHWS)
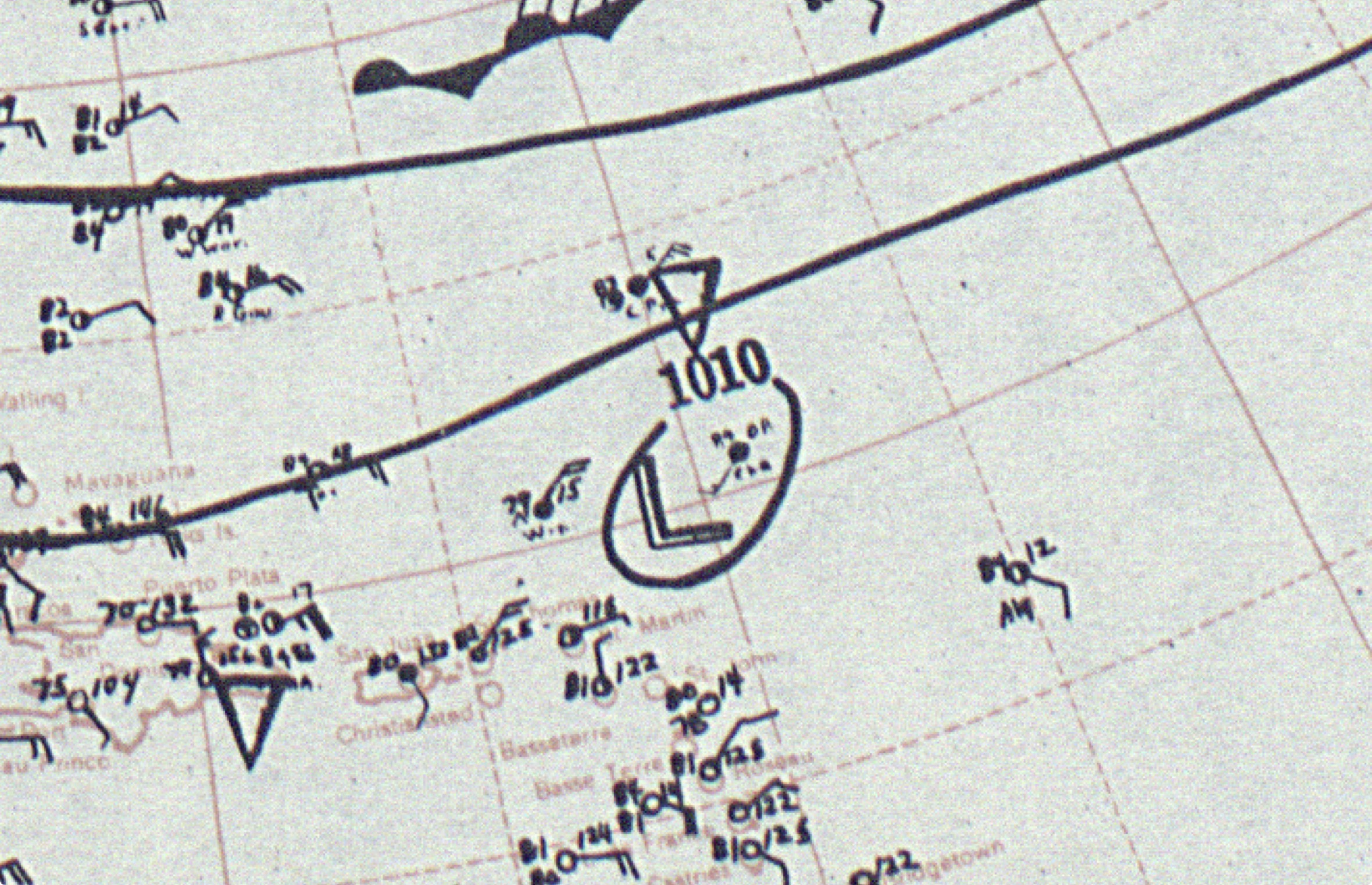
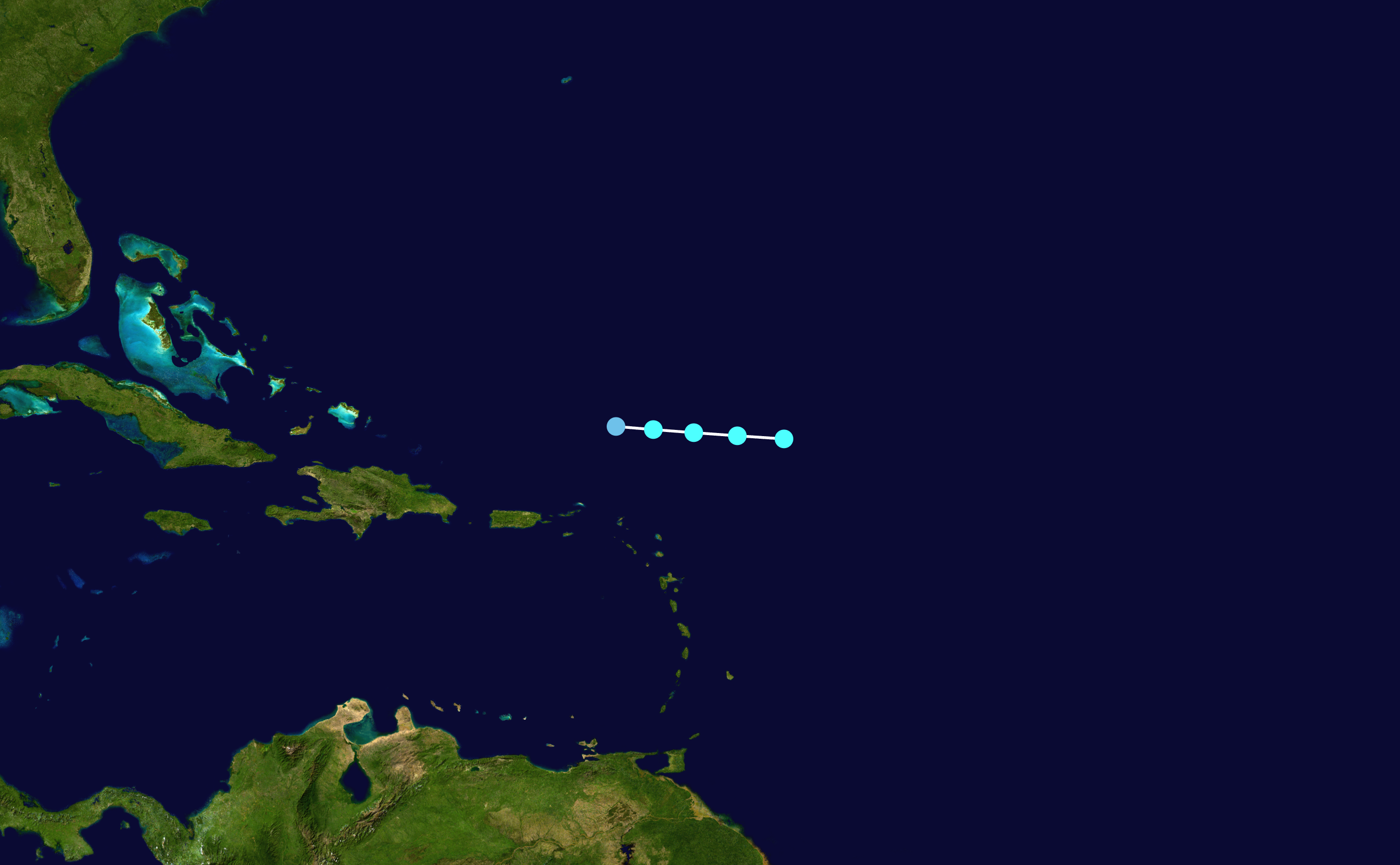
- Duration: September 7 – September 8
- Peak intensity: 40 mph (65 km/h) (1-min); 1008 mbar (hPa)

On September 7, a ship reported southwest winds at a location about 405 mi (650 km) northeast of Antigua, indicating the presence of a tropical cyclone. The storm tracked to the west-northwest without strengthening, and the following day no circulation was reported. It is estimated the storm weakened to a tropical depression and dissipated on September 8 while located about 235 mi (380 km) north-northeast of Saint Martin, although it may have remained a tropical depression throughout its short lifespan. The storm never affected land.

=== Hurricane Thirteen ===
- Category 3 hurricane (SSHWS)
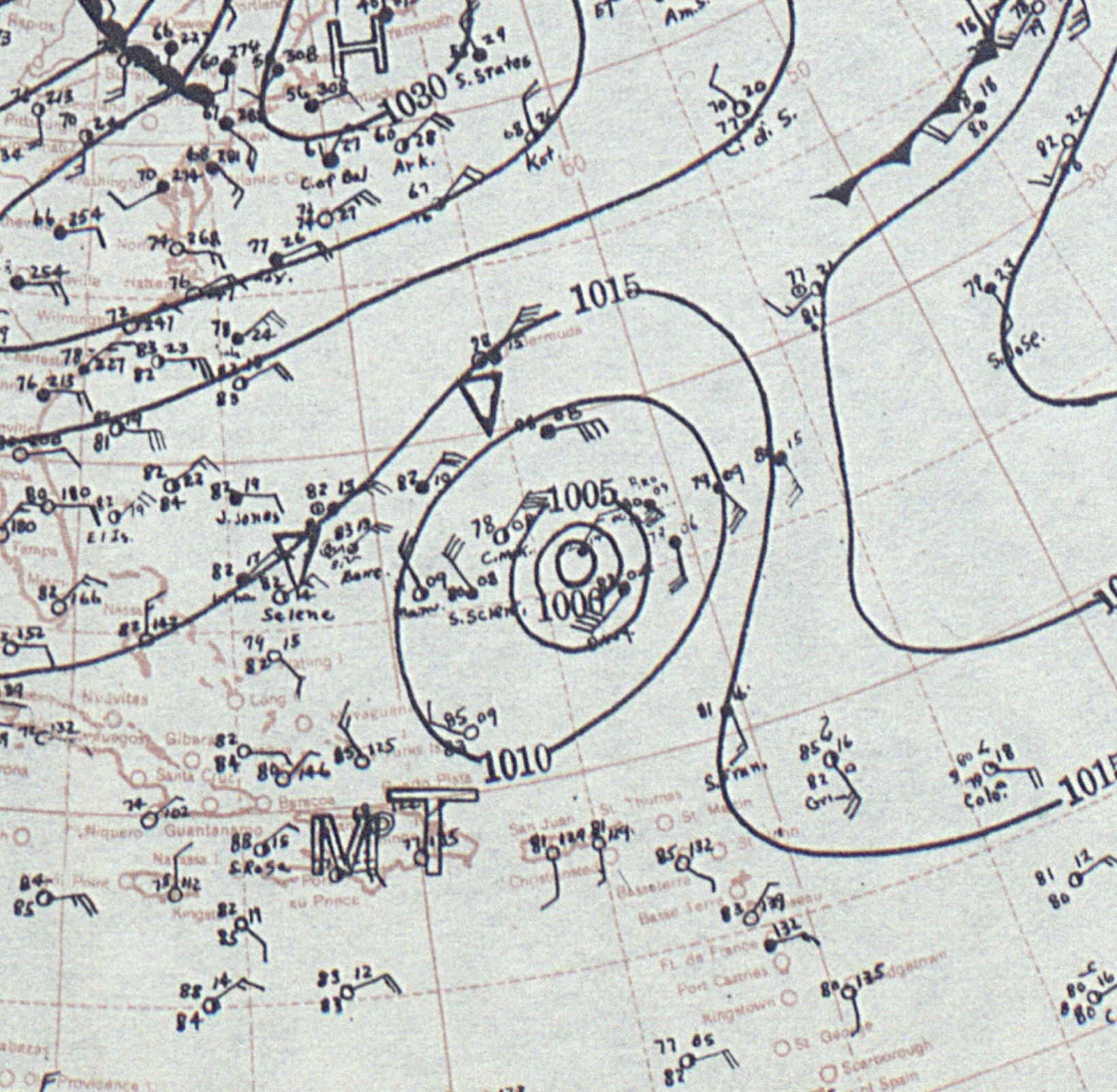
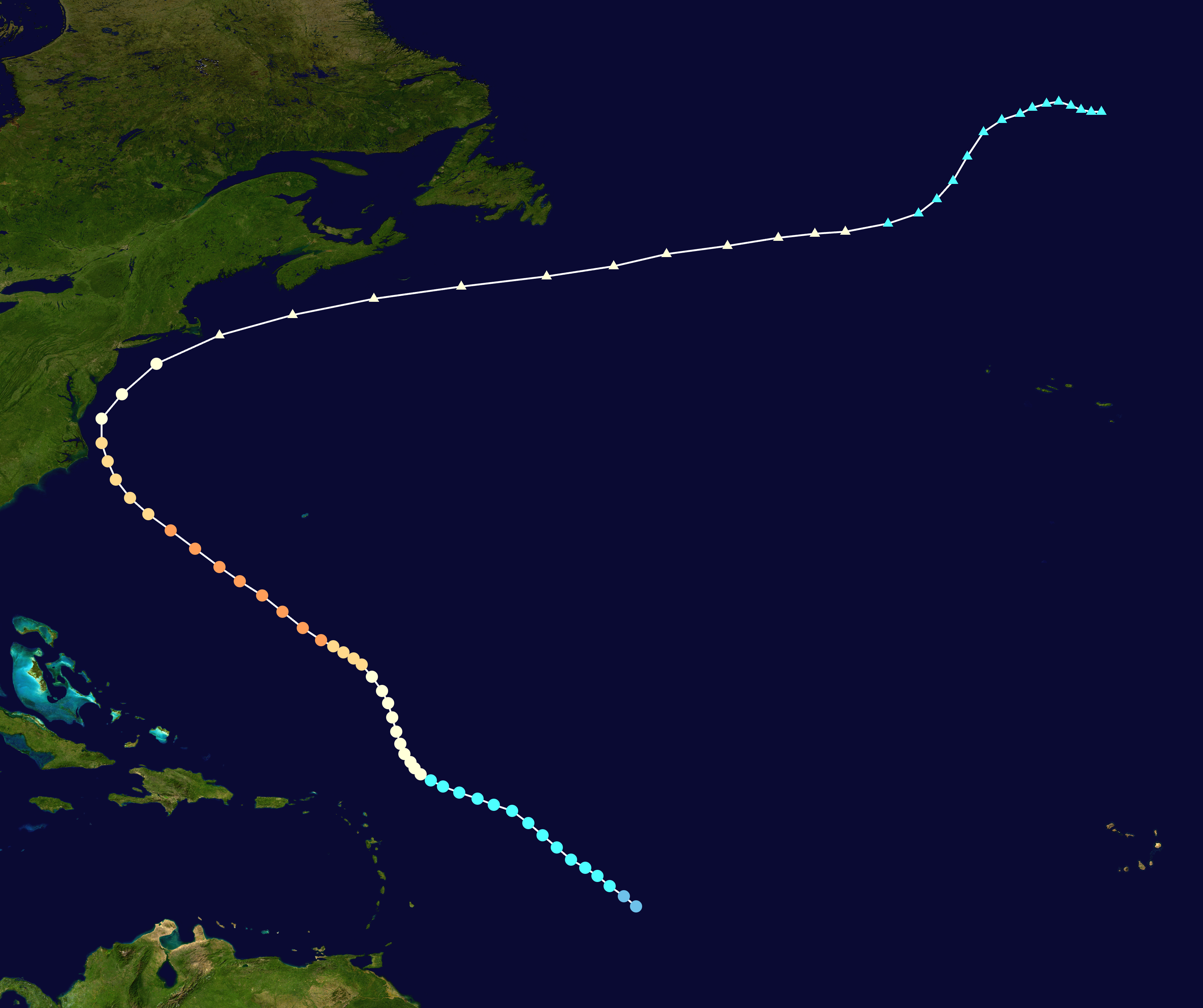
- Duration: September 8 – September 19
- Peak intensity: 120 mph (195 km/h) (1-min); 962 mbar (hPa)

A tropical storm was first observed by a ship on September 8 while located about 750 mi (1,205 km) east of Barbados. The storm moved northwestward, and slowly intensified to attain hurricane status on September 10 about 425 mi (685 km) northeast of Barbados. The hurricane continued to slowly strengthen as it decelerated its forward motion, and on September 15 it reached its peak intensity of 120 mph (195 km/h) while located 375 mi (605 km) south-southwest of Bermuda. By the morning of September 15, the hurricane had winds exceeding 25 mph (40 km/h) in a diameter of about 1,000 mi (1,610 km), among the largest tropical cyclones on record. It slowly weakened as it approached the East Coast of the United States. Late on September 18, the hurricane passed within 45 mi (70 km) of the Outer Banks before it accelerated and turned to the northeast. It remained close to the Mid-Atlantic and New England coastline, and passed near Nantucket before turning to the east-northeast. The hurricane remained south of Atlantic Canada by a short distance, and became extratropical on September 19 while located about 50 mi (80 km) east of Nantucket. The extratropical storm decelerated as it turned northeastward, and the system dissipated on September 25.

Early on September 17, Weather Bureau offices began issuing storm warnings from Beaufort, North Carolina, to the Virginia capes. In North Carolina, the hurricane produced winds of up to 90 mph (140 km/h) in Manteo. Described as one of the worst hurricanes in record in Hatteras, the storm resulted in $25,000 in damage (1936 USD) to roads and bridges and $30,000 in damage (1936 USD) to buildings and piers. Very high tides were reported along the Outer Banks, with Nags Head losing about 35 ft (11 m) of beach. The hurricane destroyed the highway bridge along the Currituck Sound, and resulted in heavy crop damage in northeastern North Carolina. The hurricane was also considered among the worst hurricanes on record in the Norfolk, Virginia, area. Winds of up to 84 mph (135 km/h) at Cape Henry destroyed windows, roofs, and some entire buildings, resulting in around $500,000 in damage (1936 USD). The hurricane produced a storm tide of 9.3 ft (2.8 m) in Sewell's Point, Virginia, the second highest on record at that location. Two locations along the James River experienced record crest levels of over 20 ft (6.1 m). Rough seas washed several boats ashore, and shipping was cancelled in and out of Norfolk. The hurricane resulted in cancelled train service and increased traffic. The hurricane was indirectly responsible for two casualties. The first fatality occurred when debris from the hurricane struck a person in the head and later died. Another person drowned in the Elizabeth River in an effort to recover a rowboat blown adrift. Though hurricane warnings were posted for the northeast United States and hurricane-force winds occurred there, damage, if any, is unknown. Extensive property damage was reported in Nova Scotia. Up to 7 in (180 mm) of precipitation washed out a number of bridges, roads, and railroad tracks, causing two train derailments. Dozens of cars stalled, while slick roads resulted in several vehicular accidents. Crops also suffered significant damage, with thousands of dollars in losses to grain alone in Annapolis Valley. One person drowned in Antigonish while swimming in a lake that swelled to about twice its normal size. In Newfoundland, rough seas capsized a few boats, causing two deaths, while two fishing stages were also destroyed. Overall, the extratropical remnants of this hurricane caused five fatalities in Atlantic Canada.

=== Tropical Storm Fourteen ===
- Tropical storm (SSHWS)
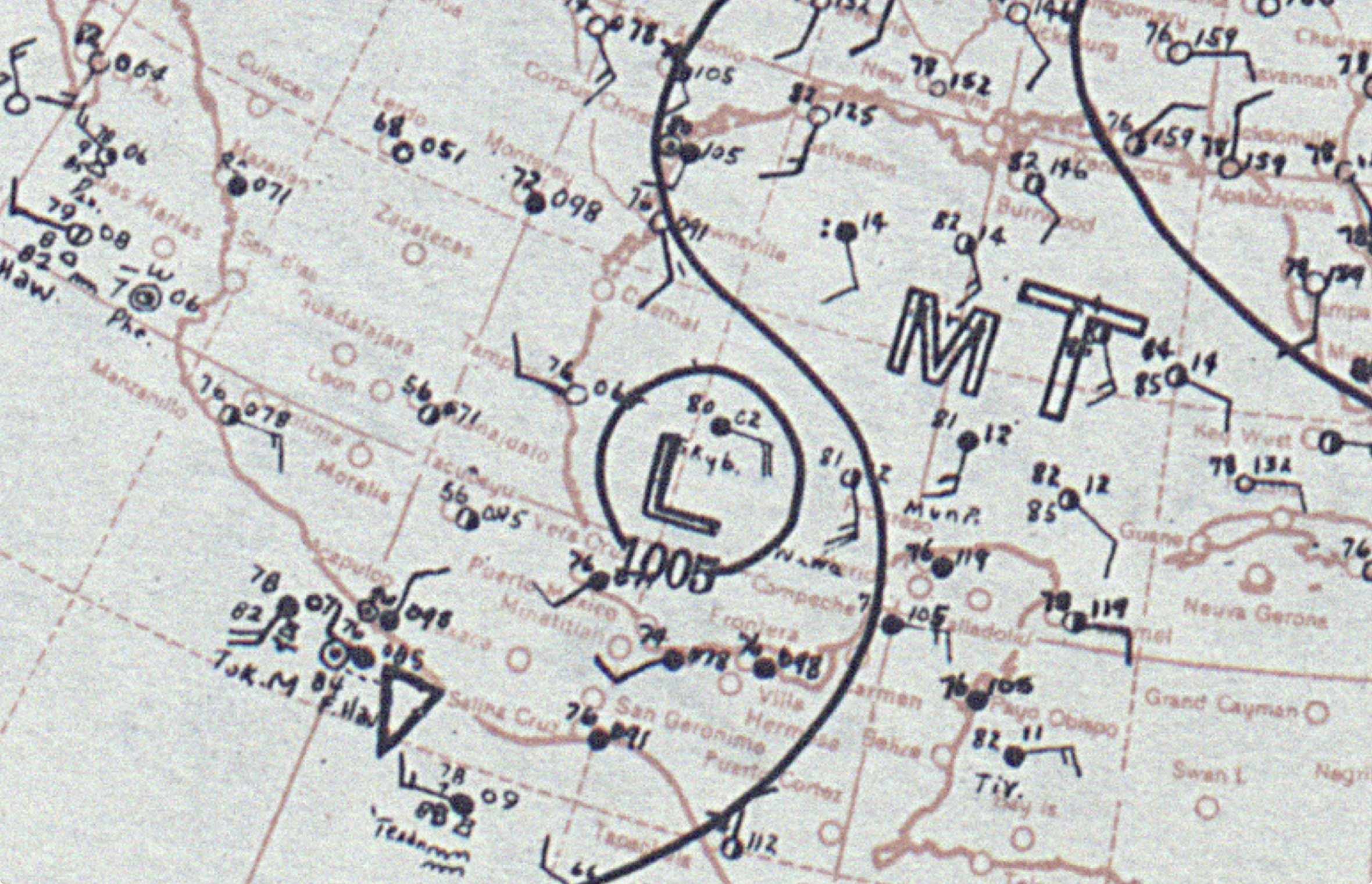
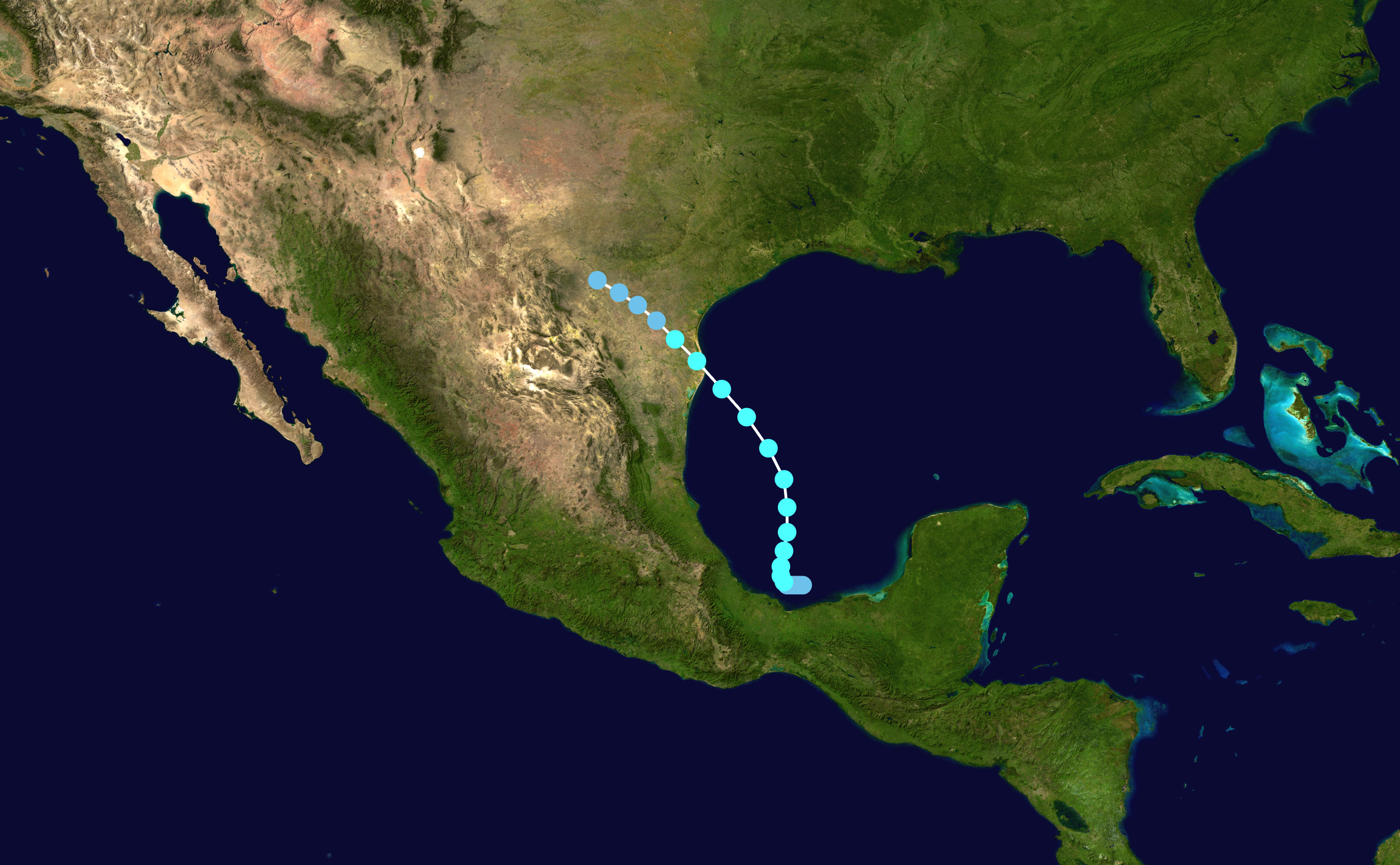
- Duration: September 10 – September 14
- Peak intensity: 50 mph (85 km/h) (1-min); 996 mbar (hPa)

A tropical storm moved northward into Acapulco in the middle of September. Its large area of disturbed weather organized in the Bay of Campeche and developed into a tropical storm on September 10 a short distance off the coast of Tabasco. The storm initially moved westward, then turned to the north. It remained a minimal tropical storm for its entire lifetime, and after turning to the north west it made landfall near Brownsville, Texas, on September 13 with winds of 50 mph (85 km/h). The system weakened over Texas, and dissipated over northern Coahuila on September 14. Winds were generally minor from the storm, and tides were not much above normal. The storm resulted in heavy rainfall totaling 30.00 in (762 mm) at Broome, Texas, between September 15 and 17. Anticipating further intensification, one bulletin from the local weather bureau recommended citizens on offshore islands to evacuate inland.

=== Hurricane Fifteen ===
- Category 2 hurricane (SSHWS)
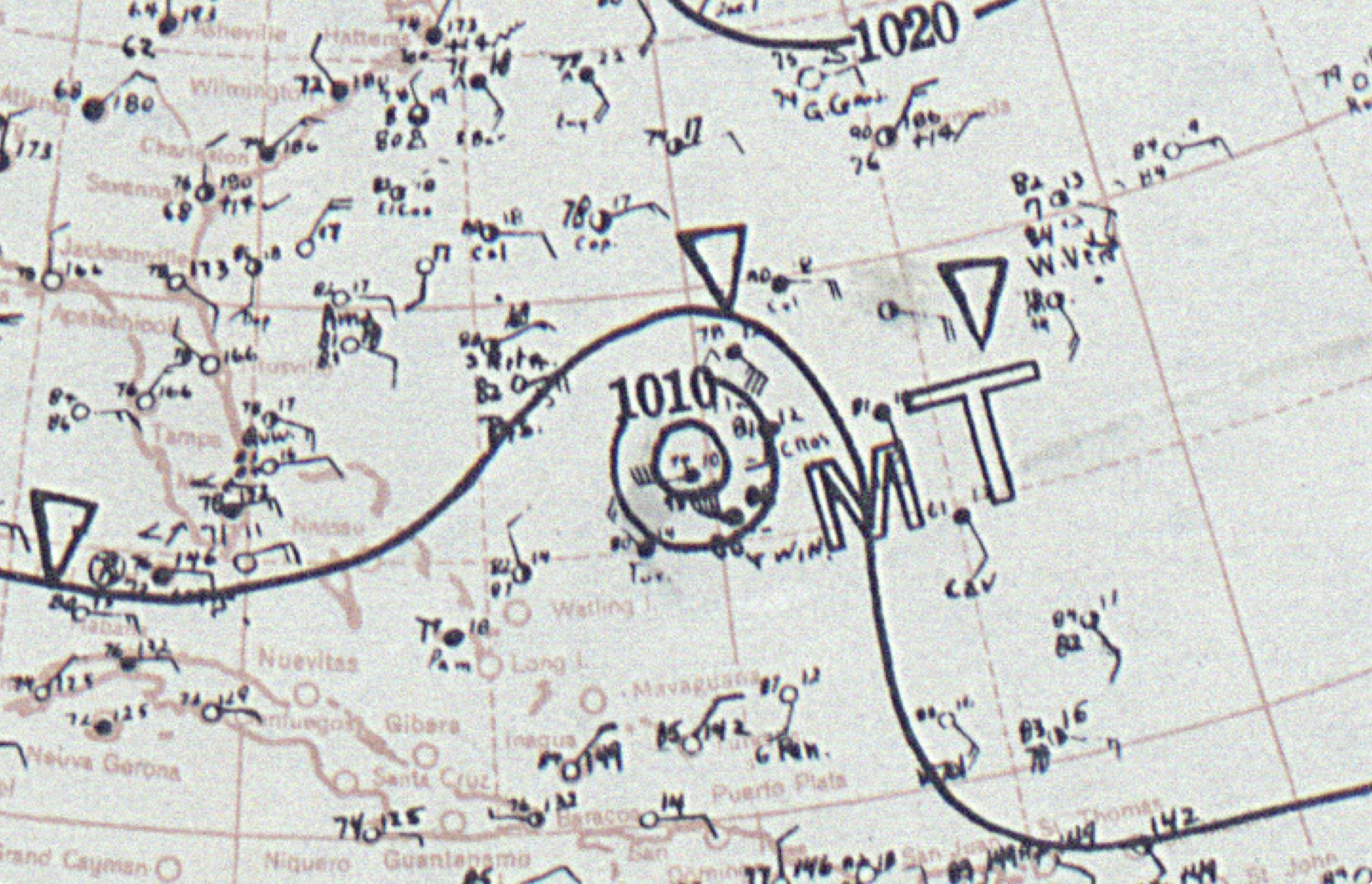
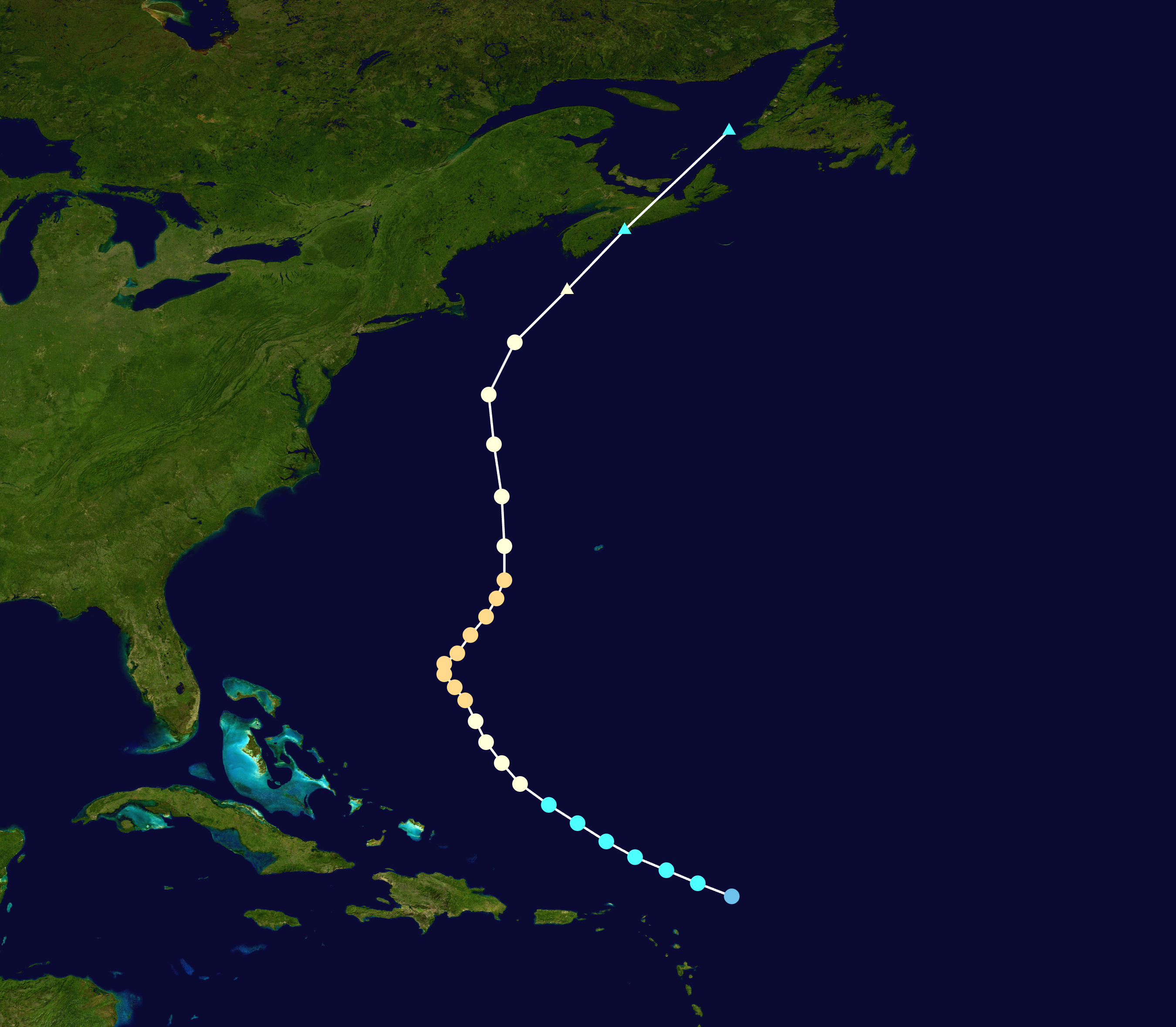
- Duration: September 18 – September 25
- Peak intensity: 105 mph (165 km/h) (1-min); 977 mbar (hPa)

A tropical storm was first observed about 140 mi (225 km) north of Anguilla on September 19. The storm moved northwestward and quickly attained hurricane status on September 20. After turning to the northeast, the hurricane reached a peak intensity of 105 mph (165 km/h) on September 21 while located about 500 mi (805 km) southwest of Bermuda. It turned to the north and slowly weakened. A cold front turned the hurricane to the northeast, and the system became extratropical on September 25 a short time before making landfall on southern Nova Scotia. Hours after striking the providence, the extratropical remnant was absorbed by the approaching cold front while located over the Gulf of St. Lawrence.

Rough seas offshore Nova Scotia capsized the ship Village Queen near Cape St. Marys, nearly drowning six fishermen. At least 13 boats also sank in Newfoundland. The storm also produced rainfall as far west as Ontario, with crops and subway systems flooded in Ottawa.

=== Tropical Depression ===
- Tropical depression (SSHWS)
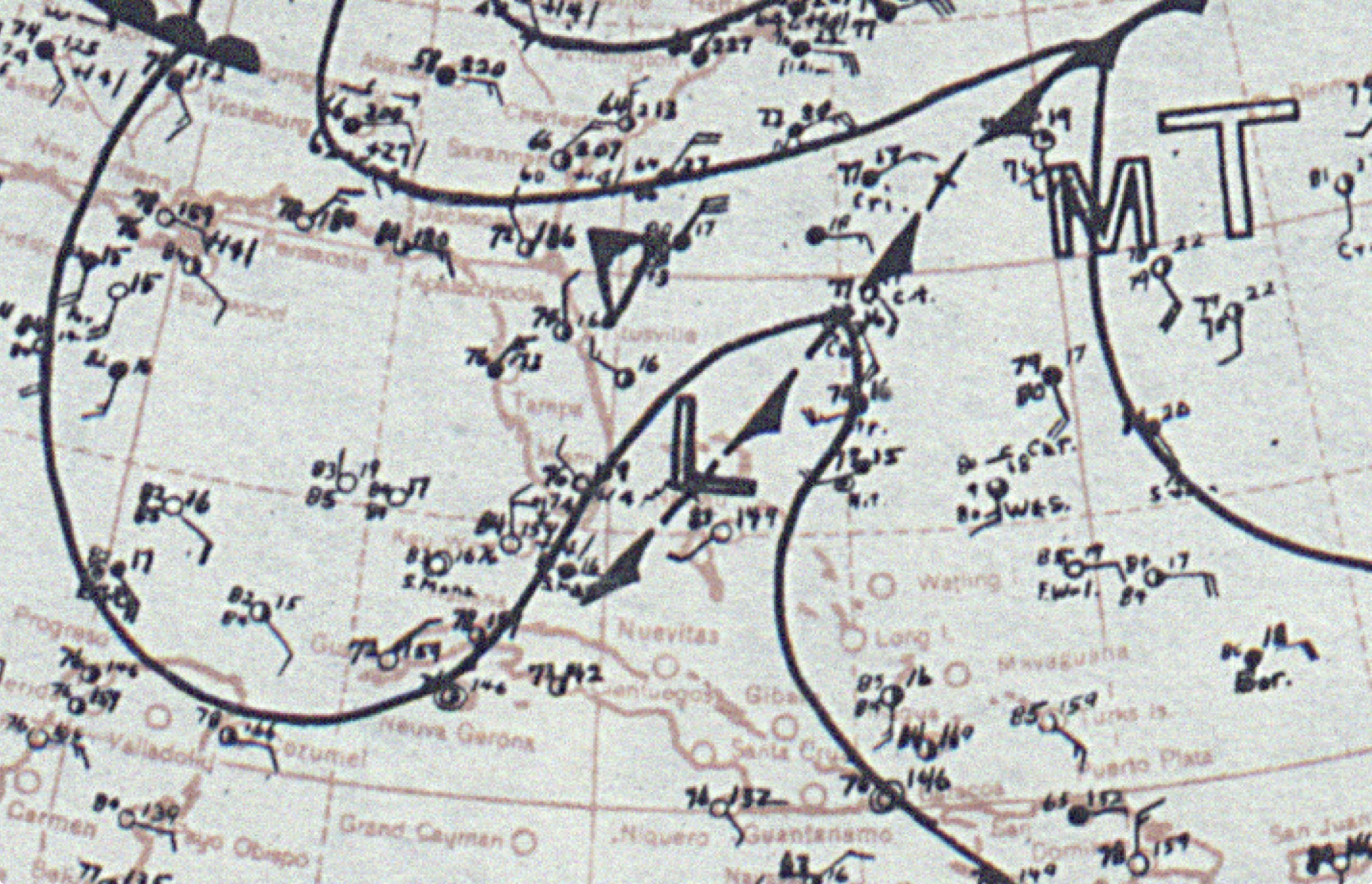
- Duration: September 25 – October 1
- Peak intensity: 35 mph (55 km/h) (1-min); 1006 mbar (hPa)

A tropical depression formed in the western Atlantic Ocean on September 25. It moved west-northwestward, making landfall on eastern Florida before entering the Gulf of Mexico on September 28. The depression turned to the northwest, and struck land near Apalachicola as a minimal system. It dissipated over land on October 1. The minimum central pressure in the depression was 1,006 mbar (29.7 inHg). The depression produced winds of up to 35 mph (55 km/h) in Tarpon Springs. Effects were minimal.

=== Tropical Storm Sixteen ===
- Tropical storm (SSHWS)
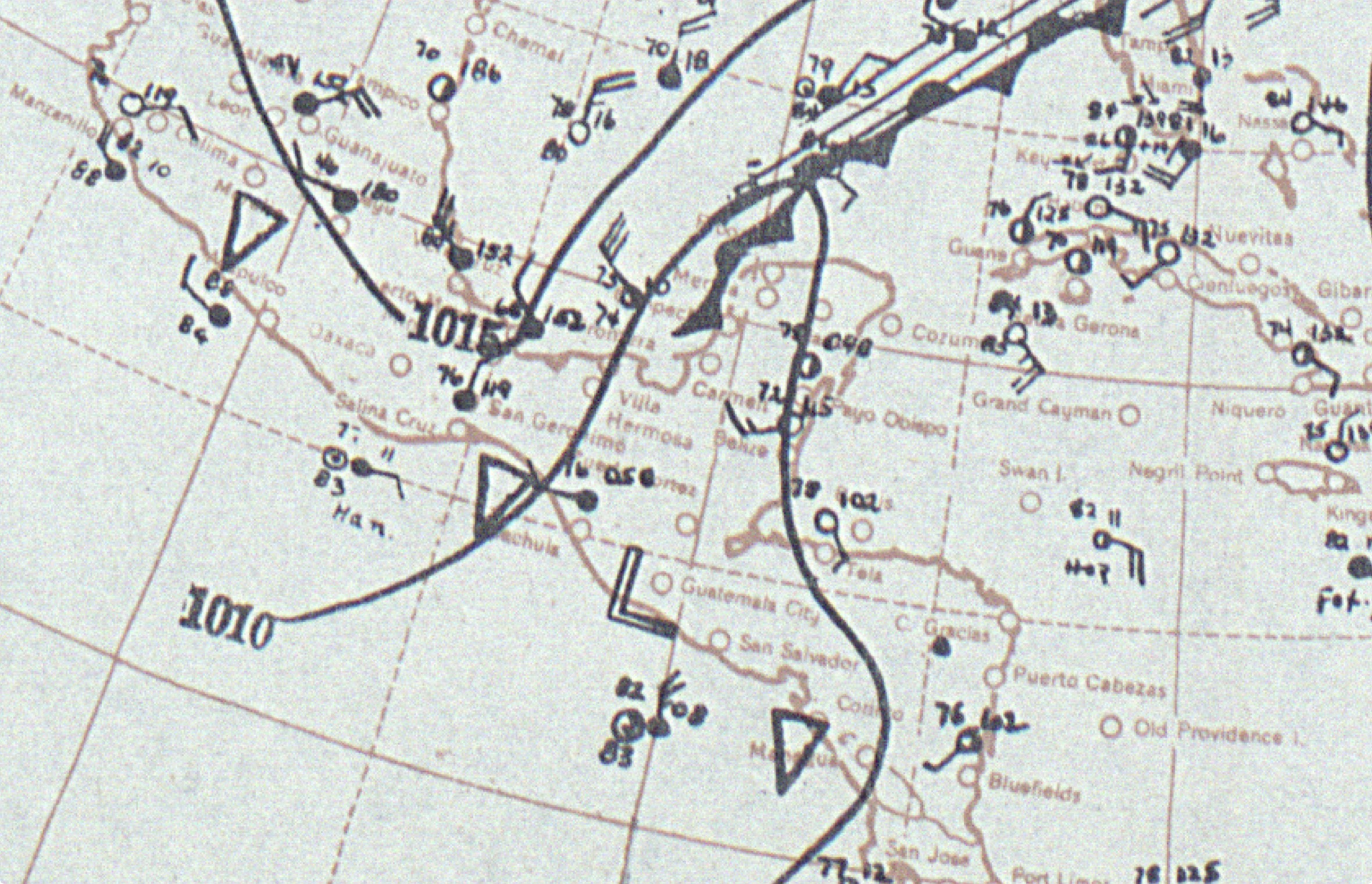
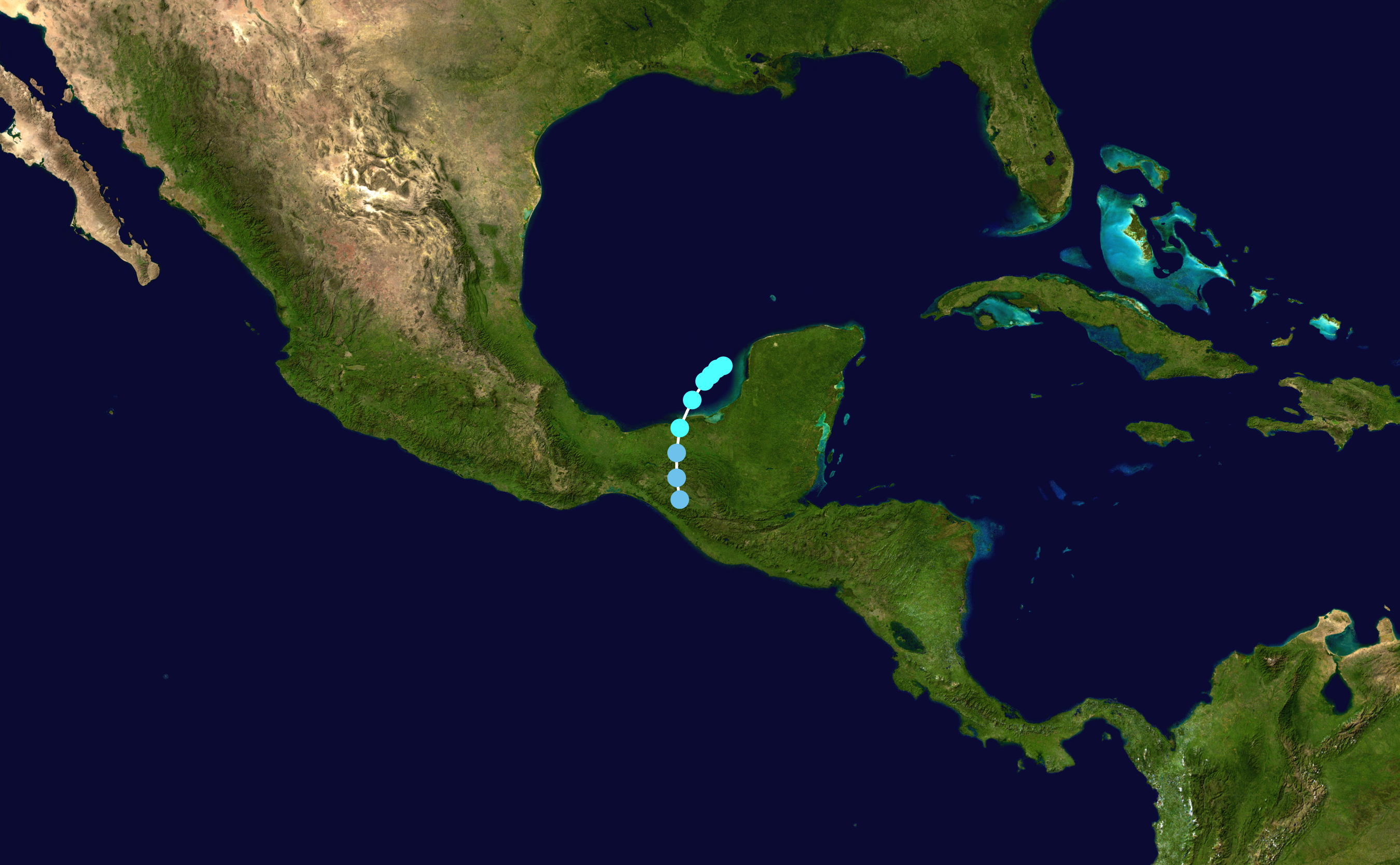
- Duration: October 9 – October 11
- Peak intensity: 40 mph (65 km/h) (1-min); 1006 mbar (hPa)

An area of disturbed weather persisted across the northwestern Caribbean Sea in early October. It tracked northwestward over the Yucatán Peninsula, and subsequent to the development of a low-level circulation the system organized into a tropical storm on October 9 while located about 60 mi (95 km) northwest of the capital of Campeche. After moving northward, the storm turned sharply southward, and made landfall in northern Tabasco as a minimal tropical storm on October 10. The system quickly weakened over land, and dissipated over Chiapas on October 11. The system dropped heavy rainfall across southeastern Mexico, though damage, if any, is unknown.

=== Tropical Storm Seventeen ===
- Tropical storm (SSHWS)
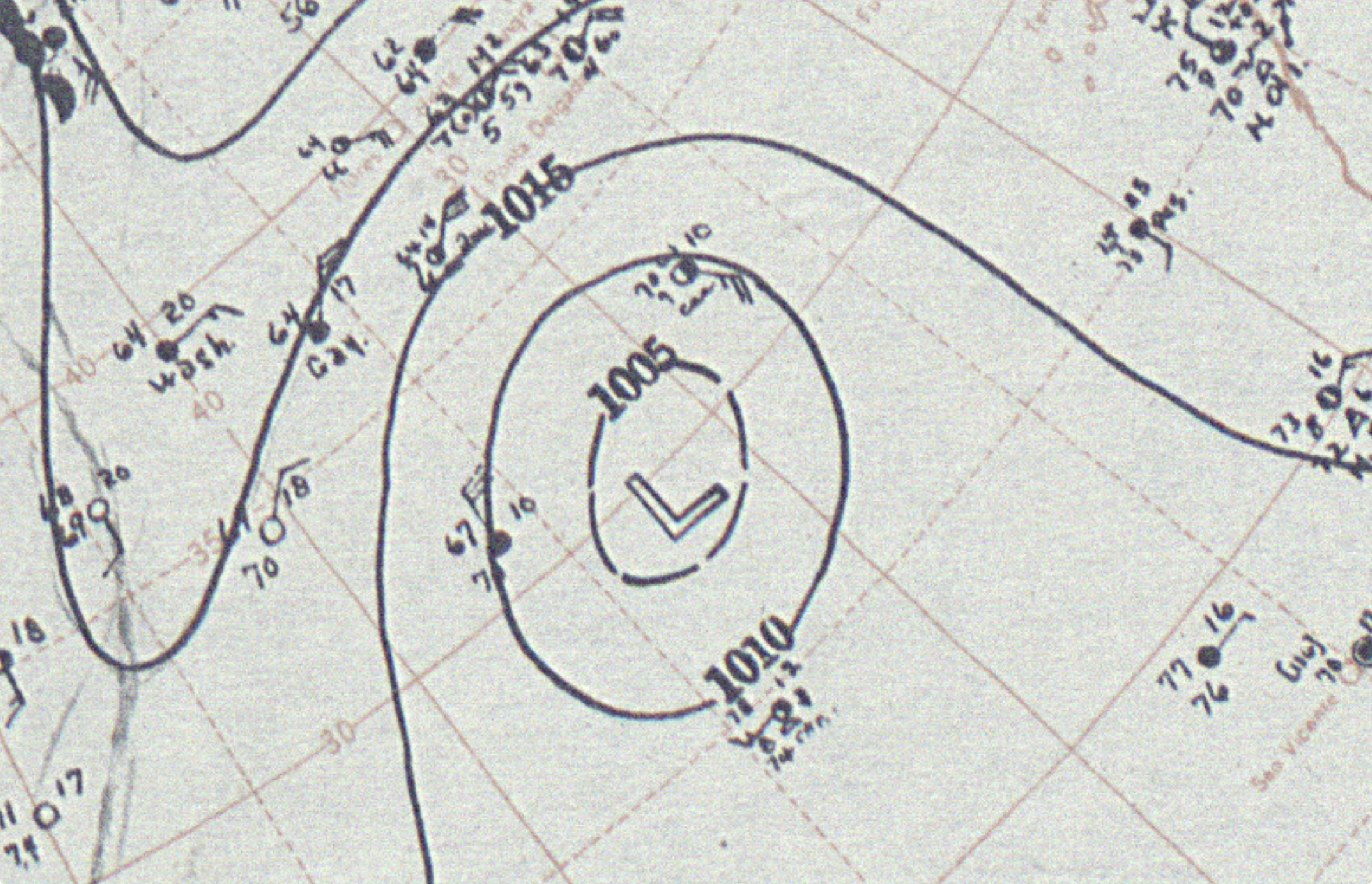
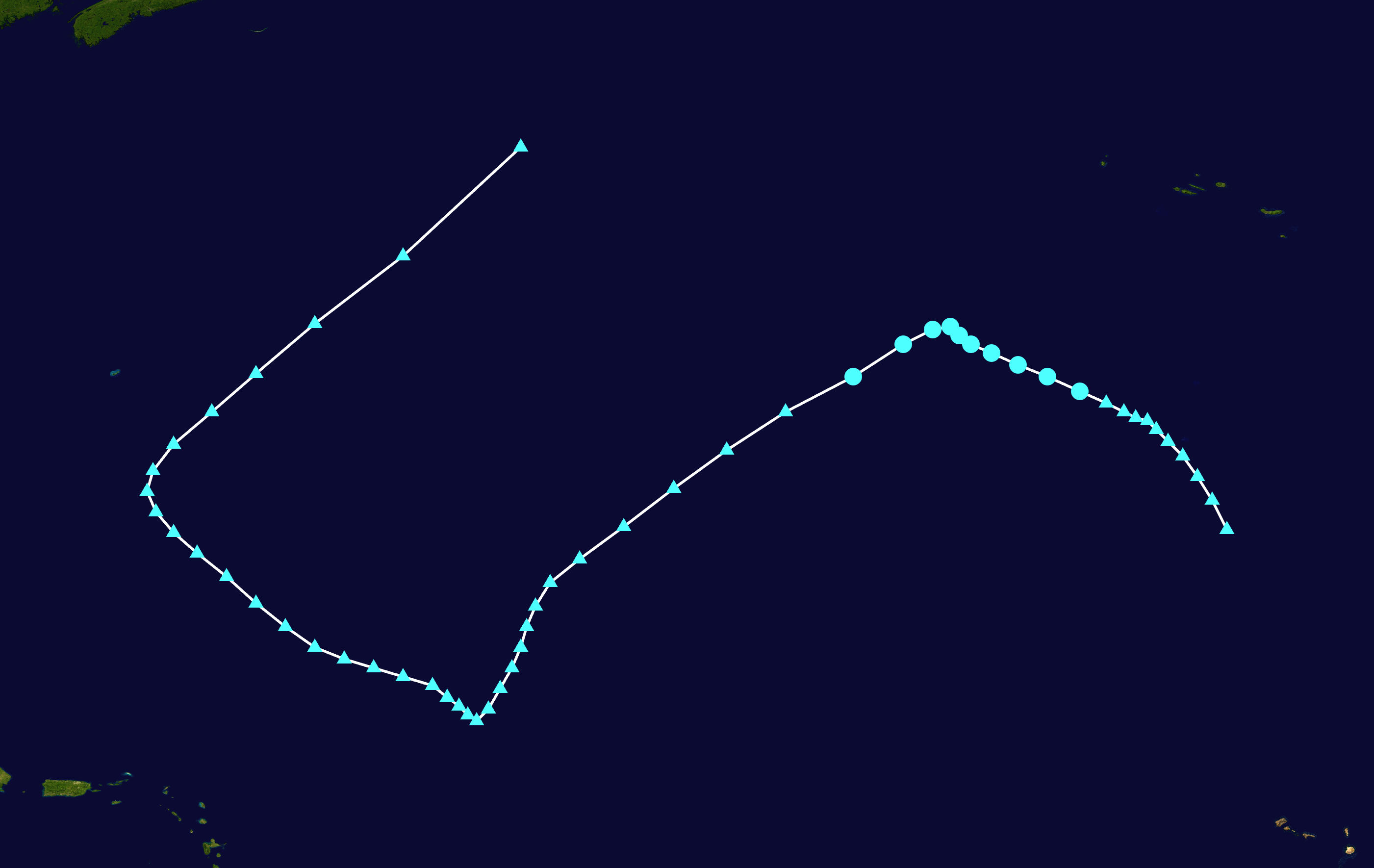
- Duration: December 4 – December 7
- Peak intensity: 65 mph (100 km/h) (1-min); 996 mbar (hPa)

Toward the end of November, a cold front was moving eastward across the central Atlantic Ocean. A broad low formed on November 28, but it was not evident by two days later. Another low formed on December 2 to the west-southwest of the Canary Islands, which was an occluded low. It moved to the west-northwest and became more tropical, finally transitioning into a tropical storm by December 4. The transition to a tropical cyclone was determined on ships reporting gale-force winds near the center, although it is possible the system was a subtropical cyclone instead. On December 6, the storm turned to the west-southwest and reached its peak winds of 65 mph (100 km/h). An approaching cold front caused the storm to become extratropical early on December 7. After reaching a position to the northeast of the Lesser Antilles, the extratropical storm turned to the northwest on December 10, later turning to the northeast on December 14. A larger extratropical low absorbed the storm on December 16.

== See also ==
- 1936 Pacific hurricane season
- 1936 Pacific typhoon season
- 1900–1950 South-West Indian Ocean cyclone seasons
- 1930s Australian region cyclone seasons
