= 1932 Pacific hurricane season =

Seasonal boundaries
- First system formed: June 21, 1932
- Last system dissipated: October 1, 1932

Strongest storm
- Name: One
  - Maximum winds: 130 mph (215 km/h)

Seasonal statistics
- Total storms: 5
- Hurricanes: 4
- Total fatalities: 15
- Total damage: $5 million (1932 USD)

Related articles
- 1932 Atlantic hurricane season; 1932 Pacific typhoon season; 1930s North Indian Ocean cyclone seasons

The 1932 Pacific hurricane season ran through the summer and fall of 1932. Before the satellite age started in the 1960s, data on east Pacific hurricanes was extremely unreliable. Most east Pacific storms were of no threat to land.

== Systems ==
=== Hurricane One ===
A tropical cyclone formed in the Gulf of Tehuantepec on June 18. It moved along the coast, became a hurricane, and was last seen June 21. The lowest pressure was an uncorrected 29.48 inHg (99.8 kPa). This hurricane was reported to have winds of 130 mph.

=== Tropical Storm Two ===
On August 21, tropical cyclone was heading northwestward south of the Revillagigedo Islands. A ship at the fringes of the cyclone measured a pressure of 29.08 inHg (98.5 kPa).

=== Hurricane Three ===
Between August 25 and 27, a "tropical hurricane" formed offshore southern Mexico, and moved north-northwest into southwest Mexico east of Manzanillo before dissipating.

=== Hurricane Four ===
Somewhere southwest of the Gulf of Tehuantepec, a tropical cyclone formed on September 24. It paralleled the coast, and intensified into a hurricane on September 25. It then recurved, and made landfall near Mazatlán late during the night of September 26 and 27, while still a hurricane. It dissipated inland over the mountains of Mexico. The lowest pressure reported by a ship was 28.64 inHg (97.0 kPa). The hurricane caused about $5,000,000 (1932 USD) in damage.

=== Hurricane Five ===
On September 26, a hurricane was spotted south of Acapulco. It headed along the coast, and entered the Gulf of California sometime on or after September 28, wherein it moved north-northwest and dissipated, with its remnants continuing into the Southwestern United States.

Powerful winds in Mazatlán were attributed to this system. Over a four-day period ending October 1, those remnants caused heavy rain of up to 7 inches (180 mm) in the mountains of Southern California. Over a seven-hour period, 4.38 inches (111 mm) fell at Tehachapi. That total by itself is enough to make this tropical cyclone one of California's wettest tropical storms. Those rains also caused flash flooding on Tehachapi and Agua Caliente Creeks, which killed fifteen people.

== See also ==
- 1932 Atlantic hurricane season
- 1932 Pacific typhoon season
- 1930s North Indian Ocean cyclone seasons
- 1900–1940 South Pacific cyclone seasons
- 1900–1950 South-West Indian Ocean cyclone seasons
- 1930s Australian region cyclone seasons
