= 1930s North Indian Ocean cyclone seasons =

The following is a list of North Indian Ocean tropical cyclones from 1930 to 1939. Records from before the 1970s were extremely unreliable, and storms that stayed at sea were often only reported by ship reports.

== 1930 ==
- May 2–7, 1930 – A cyclonic storm existed over the southern Bay of Bengal.
- May 10–13, 1930 – A cyclonic storm existed over the northern Bay of Bengal.
- June 14–16, 1930 – A shallow depression existed over the northeastern Bay of Bengal.
- June 20–23, 1930 – A depression existed over the southeastern Arabian Sea.
- June 27–30, 1930 – A cyclonic storm existed over the eastern Arabian Sea.
- June 28 – July 1, 1930 – A cyclonic storm existed over the eastern Bay of Bengal.
- July 8–10, 1930 – A shallow depression existed over the northern Bay of Bengal.
- July 11–13, 1930 – A cyclonic storm existed over the northern Bay of Bengal.
- July 21–24, 1930 – A depression existed over the northern Bay of Bengal.
- September 6–8, 1930 – A depression existed over the Andaman Sea.

=== 1937 ===
A Tropical Depression struck Maharashtra

== See also ==
- 1930s Australian region cyclone seasons
- 1900–1940 South Pacific cyclone seasons
- 1900–1950 South-West Indian Ocean cyclone seasons
- Atlantic hurricane seasons: 1930, 1931, 1932, 1933, 1934, 1935, 1936, 1937, 1938, 1939
- Eastern Pacific hurricane seasons: 1930, 1931, 1932, 1933, 1934, 1935, 1936, 1937, 1938, 1939
- Western Pacific typhoon seasons: 1930, 1931, 1932, 1933, 1934, 1935, 1936, 1937, 1938, 1939
