= 1930s Australian region cyclone seasons =

Seasonal boundaries
- First system formed: 1930
- Last system dissipated: 1940

Seasonal statistics
- Total fatalities: Unknown
- Total damage: Unknown

== Storms ==
=== Unnamed tropical cyclone near Cairns (1934) ===
On March 12, 1934, a powerful cyclone crossed the coast of Far North Queensland at Cape Tribulation. A pearling fleet was decimated by the system, resulting in the loss of 75 lives. The towns of Daintree and Mossman suffered extensive damage, with damage to vegetation reported in Cairns.

=== Unnamed tropical cyclone near Broome (1935) ===
This is Australia's second deadliest cyclone in the 20th century. The Lacepede Islands near Broome were struck sinking 21 pearling luggers with 141 lives lost.

=== Unnamed tropical cyclone near Roebourne (1939) ===
Nine people died on 11 January 1939 with the loss of the Nicol Bay, on a holiday cruise to the Ashburton River. Some properties in Roebourne, Western Australia sustained damage.

== See also ==
- 1900–1940 South Pacific cyclone seasons
- 1900–1950 South-West Indian Ocean cyclone seasons
- Atlantic hurricane seasons: 1930, 1931, 1932, 1933, 1934, 1935, 1936, 1937, 1938, 1939
- Eastern Pacific hurricane seasons: 1930, 1931, 1932, 1933, 1934, 1935, 1936, 1937, 1938, 1939
- Western Pacific typhoon seasons: 1930, 1931, 1932, 1933, 1934, 1935, 1936, 1937, 1938, 1939
- North Indian Ocean cyclone seasons: 1930, 1931, 1932, 1933, 1934, 1935, 1936, 1937, 1928, 1939
