= 1900–1940 South Pacific cyclone seasons =

Seasonal boundaries
- First system formed: January 2, 1900
- Last system dissipated: December 26, 1939

Seasonal statistics
- Total disturbances: 265
- Total fatalities: 500+
- Total damage: Unknown

Related article
- 1900–1950 South-West Indian Ocean cyclone seasons

The following is a list of all reported tropical cyclones within the South Pacific Ocean, to the east of 160°E, from 1900 to 1940.

== Background ==
Ancient Polynesians and others who inhabited the tropical Pacific before the Europeans arrived, knew of and feared the hurricanes of the South Pacific. They were keen and accurate observers of nature and developed various myths and legends, which reflected their knowledge of these systems. For example, the people of Mangaia in the Cook Islands had over 30 different names for the wind direction including Maoaketa, which indicated that a cyclonic storm existed to the west of the island. During the 1700s, Captain James Cook conducted three voyages within the Pacific Ocean and it is thought that he did not collect any information about or experience any tropical cyclones. Europeans that followed Cook soon realised that the South Pacific was not free of hurricanes and were the first to publish accounts about the systems.

During 1853, Thomas Dobson became the first person to collate information about these systems, in order to attempt to understand and explain the characteristics of 24 tropical cyclones. However, these descriptions were considered to be vague and of little value, because he only had a small amount of data and no synoptic weather charts. Over the next 40 years various reports, journals and log books on the storms were published before E Knipping consolidated these reports and extended Dobson's list out to 120 tropical cyclones during 1893. During the 1920s Stephen Sargent Visher did some research into tropical cyclones in the Pacific and visited several island nations; including Fiji, Japan and the Philippines to obtain information on potential systems. He also consulted various journals and reports as well as Dobson's and Knipping's work, before he authored a number of papers on tropical cyclones in the Pacific. These papers contained information about 259 tropical storms in the South Pacific between 160°E and 140°W, two of which occurred during 1789 and 1819, while the rest occurred between 1830 and 1923. Visher also tried to estimate how many systems were occurring on an annual basis in each area, but overcompensated for his incomplete records and came up with a figure of 12 severe tropical cyclones per year. During Visher's time and until the start of World War II, there was insufficient information available to allow for an accurate deception of tropical cyclone tracks.

== Systems ==
=== 1900–09 ===
- February 4, 1900 – A tropical cyclone impacted Fiji's Lau Islands.
- February 1900 - A tropical cyclone impacted Fiji's southeastern islands, where it caused flooding in Labasa and generated a 10 feet (3.0 m) tidal wave that impacted the island of Ono. Various small vessels were wrecked, while 1 person drowned and considerable damage was done onshore.
- March 12, 1900 – A tropical cyclone impacted Fiji's Lau Islands.
- April 2 – 3, 1900 – A tropical cyclone impacted Tonga's island group of Vava'u.
- April 12, 1900 – A tropical cyclone impacted Tonga.
- January 20, 1901 – A tropical cyclone impacted Vanuatu and caused an estimated 150 thousand francs worth of damage.
- January 27, 1901 – A tropical cyclone impacted Fiji's Lau Islands.
- January 27, 1901 – A tropical cyclone existed to the east of Tonga.
- March 13 – 14, 1901 – A tropical cyclone impacted Fiji.
- April 2, 1901 – A tropical cyclone impacted Fiji's Lau Islands.
- December 22, 1901 – A tropical cyclone impacted French Polynesia's Society Islands, where it destroyed a large part of the Papeete quays.
- December 26, 1901 – A tropical cyclone impacted Fiji's Rewa Province.
- 1901 – A tropical cyclone impacted Vanuatu and destroyed Martyr's memorial church.
- December 30, 1902 – A tropical cyclone impacted Fiji.
- January 14 – 15, 1903 – A tropical cyclone impacted French Polynesia's Tuamotu Islands, where 517 people were killed, 2 schooners were lost and 83 cutters were demolished.
- January 17, 1903 – A tropical cyclone impacted Fiji's Lau Islands.
- February 14, 1903 – A tropical cyclone impacted Tonga.
- February 1903 – A tropical cyclone impacted Samoa and American Samoa.
- March 3 – 6, 1903 – A tropical cyclone moved westwards from the island of Espiritu Santo in Vanuatu.
- April 10, 1903 – A tropical cyclone impacted Fiji.
- January 21 – 22, 1904 – A tropical cyclone impacted Fiji, where a 1.8 m (5.9 ft) storm surge was recorded in Navau.
- February 21 – 22, 1904 – A tropical cyclone impacted Fiji.
- January 6, 1905 – A tropical cyclone impacted Fiji's Lau Islands.
- January 20, 1905 – A tropical cyclone impacted Fiji.
- January 1905 – A tropical cyclone impacted the Southern Cook Islands.
- March 23 – 26, 1905 – A tropical cyclone impacted French Polynesia, where it caused 8 deaths and severe damage.
- March 1905 – A tropical cyclone impacted the Northern Cook Islands.
- February 6 – 8, 1906 – A tropical cyclone impacted French Polynesia as well as the Northern and Southern Cook Islands, where it caused more than 150 deaths and extensive damage, before heading towards the Gambier Islands.
- March 19 – 20, 1906 – A tropical cyclone impacted New Caledonia.
- February 1907 – A tropical cyclone caused significant damage to the French steamboat Frane, while impacting Vanuatu and New Caledonia.
- April 11, 1907 – A tropical cyclone was located near the island of Futuna in Vanuatu.
- December 1907 – A tropical cyclone is thought to have impacted the Solomon Islands during December 1907, as it was followed by a shortage of food.
- January 9, 1908 – A tropical cyclone was located to the east of Vanua Levu and the south-east of the Lau Islands.
- March 23, 1908 – A tropical cyclone impacted western and southern Viti Levu, where it killed two people.
- March 24, 1908 – A tropical cyclone impacted Tonga.
- March 25, 1909 – A tropical cyclone impacted the whole of Fiji.
- April 13, 1909 – A tropical cyclone impacted Tonga, which caused some damage to coconuts and plantations.

=== 1910s ===
- March 22 – 29, 1910 – A tropical cyclone impacted Fiji, Vanuatu, New Caledonia, Norfolk Island and New Zealand.
- December 31, 1910 – A tropical cyclone existed to the east of Tonga.
- January 5, 1911 – A tropical cyclone existed near Tonga.
- January 1911 – A tropical cyclone impacted Vanuatu.
- February 22 – 23, 1911 – A tropical cyclone impacted New Caledonia.
- May 2, 1911 – A tropical cyclone impacted Vanuatu.
- December 22, 1911 – A tropical cyclone passed to the south of Fiji.
- January 28 – 30, 1912 – A tropical cyclone impacted Fiji and Tonga.
- February 2 – 9, 1913 – A tropical cyclone impacted Fiji and Tonga.
- March 17 – 18, 1913 – A tropical cyclone existed to the southeast of Fiji, where it impacted Taevuni and Suva.
- March 21, 1913 – A tropical cyclone impacted Fiji.
- April 13, 1913 – A tropical cyclone impacted American Samoa.
- April 16, 1913 – A tropical cyclone was located between Fiji and Tonga.
- December 28, 1913 – A tropical cyclone passed to the east of Tonga.
- January 7, 1914 – A tropical cyclone impacted Tokelau as well as the Cook Islands.
- March 13, 1914 – The S.S. Ventura encountered a tropical cyclone within Fiji's Lau Islands about 445 km (275 mi) to the east of Suva.
- March 25, 1914 – A tropical cyclone impacted Tonga.
- December 24, 1914 – A tropical cyclone impacted Fiji.
- 1914 – A tropical cyclone impacted Kiribati and Tuvalu.
- January 13, 1915 – A tropical cyclone impacted Niue.
- January 16 – 18, 1915 – A tropical cyclone impacted Tonga.
- January 18, 1915 – A tropical cyclone impacted the Samoan Islands.
- February 12, 1915 – A tropical cyclone impacted American Samoa.
- February 26, 1915 – A tropical cyclone was located to the south of Fiji.
- March 20, 1915 – A tropical cyclone impacted Tonga.
- April 26 – 28, 1915 – A tropical cyclone impacted Norfolk Island.
- January 5 – 9, 1916 – A tropical cyclone impacted Vanuatu and New Caledonia.
- January 9, 1916 – A tropical cyclone passed about 925 km (575 mi) to the south of Suva in Fiji.
- January 1916 – A tropical cyclone caused damage to banana and coconut plantations in the Solomon Islands.
- February 10, 1916 – A tropical cyclone was located to the west of New Caledonia.
- August 2, 1916 – A tropical cyclone was located near Norfolk Island.
- February 14 – 15, 1917 – A tropical cyclone impacted New Caledonia.
- March 28 – 31, 1917 – A tropical cyclone impacted New Caledonia and Norfolk Island.
- June 23, 1917 – A tropical cyclone was located near Norfolk Island.
- December 1 – 5, 1917 – A tropical cyclone impacted New Caledonia from the west.
- November 11, 1917 – A tropical cyclone was located near the island of Tongoa.
- December 13 – 23, 1917 – A tropical cyclone impacted Australia, Fiji and New Caledonia.
- February 12 – 14, 1918 – A tropical cyclone impacted New Caledonia.
- March 1, 1918 – A tropical cyclone impacted Tonga.
- March 16 – 20, 1918 – A tropical cyclone was located near New Caledonia.
- March 18, 1918 – A tropical cyclone impacted Norfolk Island.
- March 25 – 28, 1918 – A tropical cyclone was located near New Caledonia.
- November 11, 1918 – A tropical cyclone impacted Vanuatu.
- January 12 – 15, 1919 – A tropical cyclone impacted New Caledonia.
- January 25 – 30, 1919 – A tropical cyclone impacted New Caledonia.
- January 29, 1919 – A tropical cyclone passed to the south of Fiji.
- February 9, 1919 – A tropical cyclone moved southwest through Fiji's Yasawa group of islands.
- February 10, 1919 – A tropical cyclone impacted New Caledonia.
- February 11 – 14, 1919 – A tropical cyclone impacted Norfolk Island, after moving away from the Queensland Coast.
- March 15 – 19, 1919 – A tropical cyclone impacted New Caledonia.
- March 28, 1919 – A tropical cyclone impacted Fiji.
- April 14 – 19, 1919 – A tropical cyclone impacted New Caledonia and Norfolk Island.
- June 2, 1919 – A tropical cyclone impacted Norfolk Island.
- July 28, 1919 – A tropical cyclone was located between Queensland and New Caledonia.
- October 28 – 30, 1919 – A tropical cyclone impacted New Caledonia.
- October 29 – 30, 1919 – A tropical cyclone impacted Norfolk Island.
- December 29 – 30, 1919 – A tropical cyclone impacted New Caledonia.

=== 1920s ===
- January 15 – 18, 1920 – A tropical cyclone impacted Tonga.
- January 18 – 19, 1920 – A tropical cyclone impacted Niue.
- January 24, 1920 – A tropical cyclone impacted Norfolk Island.
- February 11 – 14, 1920 – A tropical cyclone impacted New Caledonia and Norfolk Island.
- February 24, 1920 – A tropical cyclone impacted Fiji.
- March 3 – 4, 1920 – A tropical cyclone moved south-eastwards in between Fiji and Tonga.
- March 15 – 18, 1920 – A tropical cyclone impacted New Caledonia.
- March 23 – 27, 1920 – A tropical cyclone impacted Norfolk Island.
- January 13, 1921 – A tropical cyclone impacted Norfolk Island.
- January 31, 1921 – A tropical cyclone was located to the south of New Caledonia.
- February 13, 1921 – A tropical cyclone impacted Fiji and New Caledonia.
- February 13, 1921 – A tropical cyclone impacted Fiji's Lau Islands.
- August 20, 1921 – A tropical cyclone impacted French Polynesia's Marquesas Islands.
- October 2 – 6, 1921 – A tropical cyclone was located between Queensland and New Caledonia.
- November 23, 1921 – A tropical cyclone was located near the islands of Luganville and Canal Segond in Vanuatu.
- December 11, 1921 – A tropical cyclone impacted New Caledonia and Norfolk Island.
- January 19 – 24, 1922 – A tropical cyclone impacted New Caledonia and Norfolk Island.
- February 3–4, 1922 – A tropical cyclone was located near Vanuatu.
- February 25 – 26, 1922 – A tropical cyclone was located near Vanuatu.
- February 25, 1922 – A tropical cyclone impacted Norfolk Island as it moved south-southeastwards from New Caledonia.
- February 1922 – A tropical cyclone impacted French Polynesia's Marquesas Islands.
- December 17 – 23, 1922 – A tropical cyclone impacted Fiji, Vanuatu, New Caledonia and Norfolk Island.
- January 29, 1923 – A tropical cyclone impacted the whole of Fiji.
- January 29 – February 4, 1923 – A tropical cyclone passed over New Caledonia, Norfolk Island and New Zealand.
- February 1 – 5, 1923 – A tropical cyclone was located to the north of New Zealand's Kermadic Islands.
- February 10 – 15, 1923 – A tropical cyclone had a minor impact on Fiji, as it moved eastwards from New Caledonia.
- February 13 – 16, 1923 – A tropical cyclone impacted New Caledonia and Norfolk Island.
- February 13 – 16, 1923 – A tropical cyclone impacted Norfolk Island.
- February 14 – 16, 1923 – A tropical cyclone had a minor impact on Fiji, as it moved south-eastwards from New Caledonia.
- February 16–17, 1923 – A tropical cyclone was located near Norfolk Island.
- February 27 – 28, 1923 – A tropical cyclone was located near Norfolk Island.
- March 6 – 8, 1923 – A tropical cyclone passed to the east of Apia in Samoa.
- March 15 – 16, 1923 – A tropical cyclone caused severe damage to the Lau Island of Munia, as it moved through Fiji's Lau group of islands.
- March 16, 1923 – A tropical cyclone was located near Tonga.
- April 5, 1923 – A tropical cyclone was located near Norfolk Island.
- April 29, 1923 – A tropical cyclone was located to the south of Fiji's Lau Islands.
- November 27, 1923 – A tropical cyclone had a minor impact on Fiji.
- November 28 – 29, 1923 – A tropical cyclone was located near Tonga.
- November 28 – 29, 1923 – A tropical cyclone was located near the Samoan Islands.
- December 3, 1923 – A tropical cyclone moved eastwards from Vanuatu to the northeast of Fiji.
- December 13, 1923 – A tropical cyclone had a minor impact on Fiji, while it was centred between Fiji and Tonga.
- 1923 – A tropical cyclone impacted the Southern Cook Island of Palmerston.
- March 2 – 4, 1924 – A tropical cyclone impacted Norfolk Island.
- May 15 – 18, 1924 – A tropical cyclone impacted Norfolk Island.
- September 6 – 8, 1924 – A tropical cyclone impacted Norfolk Island.
- January 24 – 27, 1925 – A tropical cyclone impacted New Zealand.
- August 12, 1925 – A tropical cyclone impacted Norfolk Island.
- December 16 – 21, 1925 – A tropical cyclone impacted Tokelau, Samoa and the Cook Islands.
- December 17, 1925 – A tropical cyclone impacted Tuvalu.
- December 31, 1925 – January 1, 1926 – A tropical cyclone impacted French Polynesia's Society Islands.
- January 1 – 3, 1926 – A tropical cyclone impacted the Samoan Islands.
- January 1926 – A tropical cyclone impacted French Polynesia.
- March 3, 1926 – A tropical cyclone impacted Fiji.
- March 26 – April 3, 1926 – A tropical cyclone impacted Tokelau, Samoa and the Cook Islands.
- May 6, 1926 – A tropical cyclone caused minor damage to palms in the northern Yasawas Islands, as it moved south-eastwards and south-westwards.
- May 13, 1926 – A tropical cyclone passed to the west of Norfolk Island.
- May 20, 1926 – A tropical cyclone moved towards Norfolk Island from the coast of Queensland while gradually weakening.
- June 2 – 3, 1926 – A tropical cyclone approached Norfolk Island from the coast of New South Wales.
- July 10 – 12, 1926 – A tropical cyclone developed to the southeast of Norfolk Island.
- December 15 – 19, 1926 – A tropical cyclone was located between Fiji and Samoa.
- January 21 – 24, 1927 – A tropical cyclone was located to the east of Suva in Fiji.
- February 10 – 11, 1927 – A tropical cyclone was located to the east of Suva in Fiji.
- May 24 – 25, 1927 – A tropical cyclone passed to the south of Fiji.
- September 15 – 17, 1927 – A tropical cyclone moved to the south of New Caledonia towards Norfolk Island and the coast of New South Wales.
- November 9, 1927 – A tropical cyclone moved to the southwest of Suva in Fiji.
- November 24 – 28, 1927 – A tropical cyclone impacted Samoa and the Southern Cook Islands.
- December 5, 1927 – A tropical cyclone impacted Kiribati and Tuvalu.
- December 27 – 30, 1927 – A tropical cyclone impacted Vanuatu.
- December 27 – 30, 1927 – A tropical cyclone impacted New Caledonia.
- February 4, 1928 – A tropical cyclone impacted Tonga.
- February 1928 – A tropical cyclone was located near Vanuatu.
- March 12 – 20, 1928 – A tropical cyclone impacted both Fiji and Tonga.
- June 14 – 15, 1928 – A tropical cyclone approached Norfolk Island from the coast of New South Wales while gradually weakening.
- July 14, 1928 – A tropical cyclone impacted Norfolk Island.
- July 27–28, 1928 – A tropical cyclone impacted Norfolk Island.
- December 26, 1928 – A tropical cyclone impacted Norfolk Island.
- January 18 – 22, 1929 – A tropical cyclone caused moderate damage to Fiji, with damage reported to palm trees and huts in the Yasawa Islands and south-western Viti Levu.
- February 18–19, 1929 – A tropical cyclone caused minor damage to Fiji.
- April 9–10, 1929 – A tropical cyclone impacted Norfolk Island.
- May 13–15, 1929 – A tropical cyclone impacted Norfolk Island.
- June 18, 1929 – A tropical cyclone passed to the southwest of Norfolk Island after moving south-eastwards from the Queensland Coast.
- June 29 – July 1, 1929 – A tropical cyclone moved south-eastwards from the Queensland Coast.
- July 29, 1929 – A tropical cyclone was located near Norfolk Island.
- August 25, 1929 – A tropical cyclone was located near Norfolk Island.
- September 10–13, 1929 – A tropical cyclone was located near Norfolk Island.
- September 20, 1929 – A tropical cyclone passed to the south of Suva, Fiji.
- October 22–29, 1929 – A tropical cyclone was located to the east of Norfolk Island.
- November 28, 1929 – A tropical cyclone impacted Fiji.
- December 8 – 13, 1929 – A tropical cyclone caused 20 deaths and widespread damage, as it impacted Tuvalu, Rotuma and Fiji.

=== 1930 ===
- January 11 – 12, 1930 – A tropical cyclone impacted the Fijian islands of Makongai, Wakaya and Ngau, where it caused a moderate amount of damage.
- February 22, 1930 – A tropical cyclone was located to the northwest of Suva, Fiji, where heavy rain and squally winds were reported.
- March 25–26, 1930 – A tropical cyclone moved south-southeastwards to the west of Suva, Fiji.
- March 1930 – A tropical cyclone impacted French Polynesia's Marquesas Islands.
- April 21 – 22, 1930 – A tropical cyclone was located near Norfolk Island.
- July 7 – 10, 1930 – A tropical cyclone was located near Norfolk Island.
- July 30, 1930 – A tropical cyclone was located near Norfolk Island.
- November 22 – 24, 1930 – A tropical cyclone impacted Rotuma, Fiji and Tonga. Severe damage to trees and buildings was reported in Fiji, while three lives and four trading vessels were lost.
- November 1930 – A tropical cyclone impacted Niue.
- December 24 – 26, 1930 – A tropical cyclone impacted Tonga, Niue, Samoa, American Samoa and the Cook Islands.

=== 1931 ===
- February 16 – March 3, 1931 – A tropical cyclone impacted Fiji where at least 225 lives were lost, resulting in the deadliest natural disaster in Fiji history. The lowest recorded air pressure was 958 hPa (mbar; 28.29 inHg). Most of the fatalities were caused by flooding, with only four attributed to the force of the cyclone's winds. Record flooding occurred on Viti Levu, causing extensive damage to infrastructure.
- April 7 – 8, 1931 – A tropical cyclone moved south-southeastwards near Suva and Kandavu, where it caused one death and a cutter to fill with water and sink near Solo Light.
- June 16–17, 1931 – A tropical cyclone developed in the Tasman Sea and moved eastwards to the south of Norfolk Island.

=== 1932 ===
- January 16 – 20, 1932 – A tropical cyclone impacted Fiji and Tonga.
- January 24 – 26, 1932 – A tropical cyclone impacted Fiji.
- February 24, 1932 – A tropical cyclone impacted New Caledonia.
- February 1932 – A tropical cyclone was located near Vanuatu.
- March 11, 1932 – A tropical cyclone impacted Tonga.
- April 26 – 27, 1932 – A tropical cyclone impacted Vanuatu.
- April 26, 1932 – A tropical cyclone was located near Norfolk Island.
- June 28 – 30, 1932 – A tropical cyclone was located near Norfolk Island.

=== 1933 ===
- January 1 – 4, 1933 – A tropical cyclone impacted Rotuma and the Samoan Islands.
- February 22 – 26, 1933 – A tropical cyclone passed between Fiji and Tonga.
- February 28, 1933 – A tropical cyclone was located to the north of Fiji.
- March 27 – 29, 1933 – A tropical cyclone was located to the south and west of Fiji.
- April 8 – 10, 1933 – A tropical cyclone impacted New Caledonia and Norfolk Island.
- April 1933 – A tropical cyclone was located near Vanuatu.
- June 22, 1933 – A tropical cyclone was located near Norfolk Island.
- August 23 – 26, 1933 – A tropical cyclone impacted French Polynesia's Austral Islands.
- September 9 – 10, 1933 – A tropical cyclone passed to the south of Norfolk Island.

=== 1934 ===
- March 17 – 19, 1934 – A tropical cyclone was located near Norfolk Island.
- March 25 – 27, 1934 – A tropical cyclone impacted New Caledonia and Norfolk Island.
- September 2 – 4, 1934 – A tropical cyclone approached Norfolk Island from the coast of New South Wales.
- December 28, 1934 – A tropical cyclone passed over Tonga's Keppel Island.

=== 1935 ===
- February 6 – 12, 1935 – A tropical cyclone impacted French Polynesia's Society Islands and the Southern Cook Islands where extensive damage was reported.
- March 8 – 12, 1935 – A tropical cyclone was located near Norfolk Island.
- March 21, 1935 – A tropical cyclone impacted Tonga.
- July 11–12, 1935 – A tropical cyclone passed about 480 km (300 mi) to the south of Fiji and moved south-southeastwards towards Tonga, where gale force winds were reported on Nuku'alofa.
- December 10, 1935 – A tropical cyclone impacted the Santa Cruz Islands, where it removed most of the vegetation on the island of Utupia.
- December 16 – 17, 1935 – A tropical cyclone was located to the northwest of Norfolk Island.
- December 1935 – A tropical cyclone impacted Vanuatu.

=== 1936 ===
- January 1936 – A tropical cyclone impacted the island of Malekula.
- January 1936 – A tropical cyclone was located near Vanuatu.
- January 14 – 19, 1936 – A tropical cyclone impacted Tokelau, Samoa, Fiji and Tonga.
- January 25 – 30, 1936 – A tropical cyclone impacted Vanuatu.
- February 2 – 6, 1936 – A tropical cyclone impacted Tonga.
- February 14 – 15, 1936 – A tropical cyclone developed near Fiji's Udu Point and moved southwards through the Lau Islands, where it caused minor damage.
- March 25, 1936 – A tropical cyclone moved from the Queensland Coast and passed over Norfolk Island, before impacting New Zealand.
- April 14–16, 1936 – A tropical cyclone was located to the northwest of Norfolk Island.
- May 26, 1936 – A tropical cyclone was located near Norfolk Island.
- August 24 – 25, 1936 – A tropical cyclone was located near Fiji and Tonga.
- November 3, 1936 – A tropical cyclone was located to the east of Norfolk Island.
- November 23, 1936 – A tropical cyclone was located to the south of Norfolk Island.
- December 29 – 30, 1936 – A tropical cyclone was located to the north-northwest of Norfolk Island.
- 1936 – A tropical cyclone impacted Palmerston Island in the Southern Cook Islands, which caused Captain J Benton to move 12 people to the island of Manihiki.

=== 1937 ===
- January 13 – 14, 1937 – A tropical cyclone was located near Norfolk Island.
- January 21–26, 1937 – A tropical cyclone impacted the Santa Cruz Islands and Vanuatu where at least six deaths were reported.
- January 28 – 29, 1937 – A tropical cyclone moved south-eastwards over Norfolk Island.
- February 8, 1937 – A tropical cyclone developed to the northeast of Vanuatu.
- February 21 – 23, 1937 – A tropical cyclone impacted Tonga where it became the worst tropical cyclone to impact the islands in 22 years.
- February 25 – 27, 1937 – A tropical cyclone impacted the Southern Cook Islands and the Austral Islands.
- March 25 – 26, 1937 – A tropical cyclone moved southwards from New Caledonia and passed near Norfolk Island.
- June 21 – 25, 1937 – A tropical cyclone was located near Norfolk Island.
- August 29 – 30, 1937 – A tropical cyclone passed to the northeast of Norfolk Island.
- October 15 – 16, 1937 – A tropical cyclone was located near Norfolk Island.
- December 27, 1937 – January 2, 1938 – A tropical cyclone moved from New Caledonia and passed over Norfolk Island, before it dissipated in the Tasman Sea during January 2, 1938.

=== 1938 ===
- February 21 – 28, 1938 – During February 21, a tropical cyclone developed about 320 km (200 mi) to the west of Lautoka, Fiji. Over the next few days, the system moved southwards and caused heavy rain, flooding and gale force winds over the island nation between February 25–28.
- April 1 – 14, 1938 – A tropical cyclone was located between the Queensland Coast and Norfolk Island.
- May 18 – 19, 1938 – A tropical cyclone was recurved near Norfolk Island.
- June 4, 1938 – A tropical cyclone was located near Norfolk Island.
- July 24–28, 1938 – A tropical cyclone was located over the Tasman Sea to the south of Norfolk Island.
- December 21 – 22, 1938 – A tropical cyclone impacted Viti Levu where it caused some minor wind damage and the main roads to be blocked by landslides.
- 1938 – A tropical cyclone impacted the Santa Cruz Islands, where it removed most of the vegetation on the island of Utupia.

=== 1939 ===
- January 15 – 21, 1939 – A tropical cyclone impacted Fiji and Tonga, where it caused severe damage to trees, buildings, roads and bridges.
- January 30, 1939 – A weakening tropical cyclone moved from southern Queensland to northern New Zealand.
- January 1939 – A tropical cyclone impacted the Samoan Islands.
- March 16, 1939 – A tropical cyclone made landfall on the Fijian island of Viti Levu.
- March 25 – 26, 1939 – A tropical cyclone impacted New Caledonia.
- March 27, 1939 – A tropical cyclone north-eastwards from the coast of New South Wales and moved near Norfolk Island.
- April 3 – 6, 1939 – A tropical cyclone impacted Rotuma and western parts of the island nation, where it had a minor impact and caused gale-force winds over the island nation.
- December 25 – 29, 1939 – During December 25, a tropical cyclone developed near the Santa Cruz Islands and moved south-eastwards towards Fiji over the next few days. The system subsequently made landfall over Viti Levu during December 28, before it passed well to the south of Nukuʻalofa, Tonga the following day. The system caused minor damage to the Fijian Islands, while a minimum pressure of 992 hPa (29.29 inHg) and wind gusts of 110 km/h (65 mph) were reported in Suva.
- December 26, 1939 – A tropical cyclone impacted the Samoan Islands.

== See also ==
- South Pacific tropical cyclone
- 1900s Australian region cyclone seasons
- 1910s Australian region cyclone seasons
- 1920s Australian region cyclone seasons
- 1930s Australian region cyclone seasons

=== 1900s ===
- Atlantic hurricane seasons: 1900, 1901, 1902, 1903, 1904, 1905, 1906, 1907, 1908, 1909
- Eastern Pacific hurricane seasons: 1900, 1901, 1902, 1903, 1904, 1905, 1906, 1907, 1908, 1909
- Western Pacific typhoon seasons: 1900, 1901, 1902, 1903, 1904, 1905, 1906, 1907, 1908, 1909
- North Indian Ocean cyclone seasons: 1900, 1901, 1902, 1903, 1904, 1905, 1906, 1907, 1908, 1909

=== 1910s ===
- Atlantic hurricane seasons: 1910, 1911, 1912, 1913, 1914, 1915, 1916, 1917, 1918, 1919
- Eastern Pacific hurricane seasons: 1910, 1911, 1912, 1913, 1914, 1915, 1916, 1917, 1918, 1919
- Western Pacific typhoon seasons: 1910, 1911, 1912, 1913, 1934, 1915, 1916, 1917, 1918, 1919
- North Indian Ocean cyclone seasons: 1910, 1911, 1912, 1913, 1914, 1915, 1916, 1917, 1918, 1919

=== 1920s ===
- Atlantic hurricane seasons: 1920, 1921, 1922, 1923, 1924, 1925, 1926, 1927, 1928, 1929
- Eastern Pacific hurricane seasons: 1920, 1921, 1922, 1923, 1924, 1925, 1926, 1927, 1928, 1929
- Western Pacific typhoon seasons: 1920, 1921, 1922, 1923, 1924, 1925, 1926, 1927, 1928, 1929
- North Indian Ocean cyclone seasons: 1920, 1921, 1922, 1923, 1924, 1925, 1926, 1927, 1928, 1929

=== 1930s ===
- Atlantic hurricane seasons: 1930, 1931, 1932, 1933, 1934, 1935, 1936, 1937, 1938, 1939
- Eastern Pacific hurricane seasons: 1930, 1931, 1932, 1933, 1934, 1935, 1936, 1937, 1938, 1939
- Western Pacific typhoon seasons: 1930, 1931, 1932, 1933, 1934, 1935, 1936, 1937, 1938, 1939
- North Indian Ocean cyclone seasons: 1930, 1931, 1932, 1933, 1934, 1935, 1936, 1937, 1928, 1939
