= 1920s Australian region cyclone seasons =

Seasonal boundaries
- First system formed: 1920
- Last system dissipated: 1930

Seasonal statistics
- Total fatalities: Unknown
- Total damage: Unknown

== Storms ==
=== Unnamed tropical cyclone (1923) ===
This cyclone developed on 21 March 1923 east of Cape York and then devastated the normally cyclone free Torres Strait Islands. It then moved over the Gulf of Carpentaria where 20 people died around 28 March when the steamer SS Douglas Mawson sank. The cyclone decayed around 2 April.

=== Unnamed tropical cyclone near Roebourne (1925) ===
After this cyclone on 21 January 1925 near Roebourne, Western Australia only a very small portion of the land end of the Point Samson jetty was left intact. Almost 5 km of the tramline was washed away and the Pope's Nose Creek bridge was badly damaged. At Cossack the sea in the creek rose 7.2 m, covering the road and surrounding country for about a mile (1.6 km). Seven luggers and a schooner which had sheltered in Cossack Creek were lifted 100 m into the mangroves by the storm surge. Not a building was left unscathed in Roebourne. Residents sheltered in more substantial stone buildings as the timber houses were razed. The Jubilee Hotel was unroofed and the other two hotels badly damaged.

=== Unnamed tropical cyclone near Yamdena (1925) ===
In April, a tropical cyclone destroyed most houses in Yamdena. 10 people were killed on the island of Selaru, along with destruction of plantations, damage to houses, and palm trees being blown over.

== See also ==
- 1900–1940 South Pacific cyclone seasons
- 1900–1950 South-West Indian Ocean cyclone seasons
- Atlantic hurricane seasons: 1920, 1921, 1922, 1923, 1924, 1925, 1926, 1927, 1928, 1929
- Eastern Pacific hurricane seasons: 1920, 1921, 1922, 1923, 1924, 1925, 1926, 1927, 1928, 1929
- Western Pacific typhoon seasons: 1920, 1921, 1922, 1923, 1924, 1925, 1926, 1927, 1928, 1929
- North Indian Ocean cyclone seasons: 1920, 1921, 1922, 1923, 1924, 1925, 1926, 1927, 1928, 1929
