= 1920s North Indian Ocean cyclone seasons =

The following is a list of North Indian Ocean tropical cyclones from 1920 to 1929. Records from before the 1970s were extremely unreliable, and storms that stayed at sea were often only reported by ship reports.

== 1928 ==
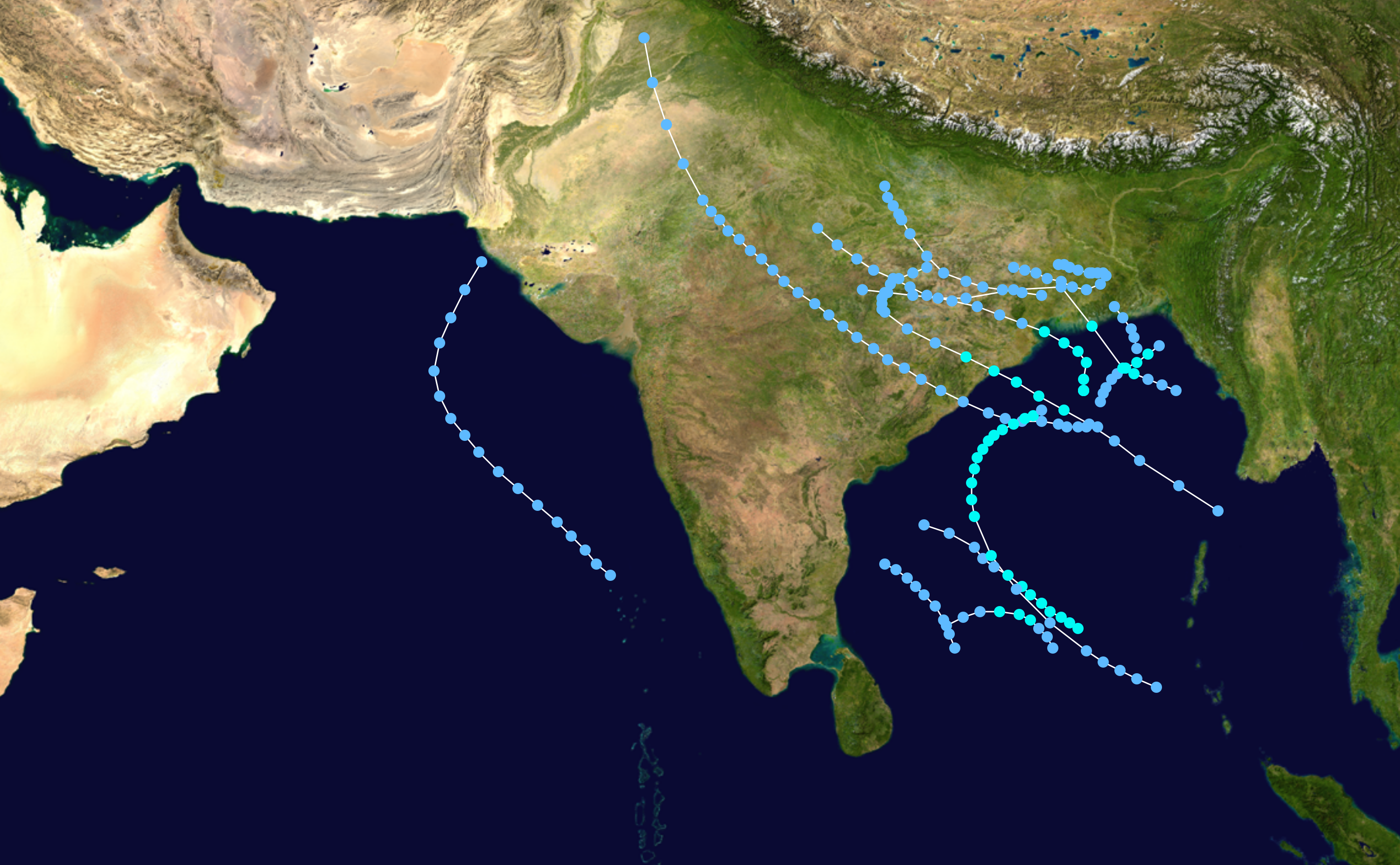
Seasonal summary

- December 31, 1927 – January 5, 1928 – A depression existed over the southern Bay of Bengal.
- February 29 – March 6, 1928 – A depression existed over the northeastern Arabian Sea.
- March 24–28, 1928 – A cyclonic storm existed over the southern Bay of Bengal.

== 1927 ==
A tropical storm struck Maharashtra

== 1929 ==
There were 15 depressions and 6 cyclonic storms.

== See also ==
- 1920s Australian region cyclone seasons
- 1900–1940 South Pacific cyclone seasons
- 1900–1950 South-West Indian Ocean cyclone seasons
- Atlantic hurricane seasons: 1920, 1921, 1922, 1923, 1924, 1925, 1926, 1927, 1928, 1929
- Eastern Pacific hurricane seasons: 1920, 1921, 1922, 1923, 1924, 1925, 1926, 1927, 1928, 1929
- Western Pacific typhoon seasons: 1920, 1921, 1922, 1923, 1924, 1925, 1926, 1927, 1928, 1929
