= 1926 Pacific hurricane season =

Seasonal boundaries
- First system formed: June 13, 1926
- Last system dissipated: October 11, 1926

Strongest storm
- Name: Two
  - Lowest pressure: 978 mbar (hPa; 28.88 inHg)

Seasonal statistics
- Total storms: 8
- Hurricanes: 1
- Total fatalities: Unknown
- Total damage: Unknown

Related articles
- 1926 Atlantic hurricane season; 1926 Pacific typhoon season; 1920s North Indian Ocean cyclone seasons

The 1926 Pacific hurricane season ran through the summer and fall of 1926. Before the satellite age started in the 1960s, data on east Pacific hurricanes was extremely unreliable. Most east Pacific storms were of no threat to land.

== Systems ==
=== Tropical Storm One ===
A tropical storm existed in the Gulf of Tehuantepec on June 13. The lowest reported pressure was 29.55 inHg (100.1 kPa).

=== Hurricane Two ===
Well south of Mexico, a tropical cyclone formed on July 5. It moved northwestward, and was last observed on July 9 while located south of the southern tip of the Baja California Peninsula. It was a hurricane, and the lowest reported pressure was 28.90 inHg (97.9 kPa).

=== Tropical Cyclone Three ===
Far from land, a tropical cyclone was reported on July 21. It had gale-force winds and a minimum reported pressure of 29.49 inHg (99.9 kPa).

=== Tropical Cyclone Four ===
On August 8, a tropical cyclone began forming. It was definitely extant on August 11, and was last seen on August 15. It caused gales and had a lowest reported pressure of 29.44 inHg (99.7 kPa).

=== Tropical Cyclone Five ===
Another tropical cyclone was observed from August 22 to 23. It had a lowest reported pressure of 29.60 inHg (100.2 kPa) and also caused gales.

=== Tropical Cyclone Six ===
A tropical cyclone existed from September 14 to 16, during which time it moved along the coast. The lowest reported pressure was 29.64 inHg (100.4 kPa). It caused heavy rain.

=== Tropical Cyclone Seven ===
A tropical cyclone moved along the coast from Manzanillo, to Mazatlán, to the southern tip of the Baja California Peninsula, from September 24 to 26. It had gale-force winds, a lowest reported pressure of 29.56 inHg (100.1 kPa), and caused heavy rainfall.

=== Tropical Storm Eight ===
A tropical cyclone formed south of Acapulco on October 2. The next day, it was a tropical storm. It pretty much hung around in the same area, and dissipated near the western Gulf of Tehuantepec on October 11. The lowest reported pressure was 29.55 inHg (100.1 kPa).

== See also ==
- 1926 Atlantic hurricane season
- 1926 Pacific typhoon season
- 1920s North Indian Ocean cyclone seasons
- 1900–1940 South Pacific cyclone seasons
- 1900–1950 South-West Indian Ocean cyclone seasons
- 1920s Australian region cyclone seasons
