= 1928 Pacific hurricane season =

Seasonal boundaries
- First system formed: May 24, 1928
- Last system dissipated: October 17, 1928

Strongest storm
- Name: Four
  - Lowest pressure: 965 mbar (hPa; 28.5 inHg)

Seasonal statistics
- Total storms: 9
- Hurricanes: 4
- Total fatalities: 14
- Total damage: Unknown

Related articles
- 1928 Atlantic hurricane season; 1928 Pacific typhoon season; 1920s North Indian Ocean cyclone seasons

The 1928 Pacific hurricane season ran through the summer and fall of 1928. Before the satellite age started in the 1960s, data on east Pacific hurricanes was extremely unreliable. Most east Pacific storms were of no threat to land.

== Systems ==
=== Tropical Cyclone One ===
A weak tropical cyclone existed south of the Gulf of California was spotted on May 24. It moved westward, and was last seen on May 27. The lowest pressure reported was 29.77 inHg (100.8 kPa).

=== Tropical Cyclone Two ===
A tropical cyclone in the Gulf of Tehuantepec produced gales on June 5. The lowest reported pressure was 29.67 inHg (100.5 kPa).

=== Hurricane Three ===
A hurricane existed south of Cape Corrientes on July 28 and 29. The lowest reported pressure was a reading of 29.64 inHg (100.4 kPa).

=== Hurricane Four ===
A tropical cyclone was noticed just south of the Mexican coast on August 6. This system might have formed south of Costa Rica three days earlier. Wherever it formed, this tropical cyclone intensified into a hurricane, and paralleled the coast. It passed south of the Gulf of California on August 10. The hurricane passed northwestward of Cabo San Lucas on September, and dissipated on August 11 while over the southern part of the Baja California peninsula. The lowest pressure reported in association with this hurricane was 28.50 inHg (96.5 kPa).

This hurricane brought gale or hurricane-force winds to several areas of the Mexican coast. An American steamer, the William A. McKenney, had its cargo and structure damaged by the hurricane. Repairs were attempted during the storm, and 14 members of its crew were washed overboard and drowned.

=== Tropical Cyclone Five ===
On September 1, a tropical cyclone formed well south of the southern tip of the Baja California Peninsula. It moved west-northwest and was last seen on September 3. A ship reported a pressure reading of 29.44 inHg (99.7 kPa).

=== Hurricane Six ===
About 200 miles west-southwest of Acapulco, a tropical cyclone formed on September 17. It slowly moved northwestward. It had intensified into a hurricane by September 18. On September 21, the hurricane weakened and recurved to the east-northeast. It made landfall north of Mazatlán and became a remnant over Mexico. Its remnants had crossed Mexico by September 22 and entered the Gulf of Mexico south of Brownsville, Texas. They never developed into anything, and had dissipated by the end of the month. The lowest pressure reported by a ship was 28.82 inHg (97.6 kPa).

=== Tropical Cyclone Seven ===
From September 20 to 22, a tropical cyclone existed south of the Gulf of Tehuantepec.

=== Hurricane Eight ===
On October 7, at a location well south of the entrance to the Gulf of California, a hurricane existed. It was moving northwest. A ship measured a central pressure of 29.60 inHg (100.2 kPa).

=== Tropical Cyclone Nine ===
On October 16 and 17, a ship encountered a tropical cyclone well south of the southern tip of the Baja California peninsula. The ship reported a pressure of 29.48 inHg (99.8 kPa).

== See also ==
- 1928 Atlantic hurricane season
- 1928 Pacific typhoon season
- 1920s North Indian Ocean cyclone seasons
- 1900–1940 South Pacific cyclone seasons
- 1900–1950 South-West Indian Ocean cyclone seasons
- 1920s Australian region cyclone seasons
