= 1920–1935 Pacific typhoon seasons =

The following is a list of Pacific typhoon seasons from 1920 to 1935. Data from these years was extremely unreliable, so there were many more typhoons that did not hit land and were not detected by ships. The average from these times was 23 tropical storms, which now would be considered a well-below-average season.

Pacific typhoon seasons

1901, 1902–1919, 1920–1935, 1936, 1937

== 1920 ==
1920–1935 Pacific typhoon seasons

Seasonal boundaries
- First system formed: January 1920
- Last system dissipated: November 12, 1920

Seasonal statistics
- Total depressions: 20
- Total fatalities: Unknown
- Total damage: Unknown

Related articles
- 1920 Atlantic hurricane season; 1920–24 Pacific hurricane seasons; 1920s North Indian Ocean cyclone seasons

In 1920, there were 20 tropical cyclones in the western Pacific Ocean.

== 1921 ==
1920–1935 Pacific typhoon seasons

Seasonal boundaries
- First system formed: June 14, 1921
- Last system dissipated: December 9, 1921

Seasonal statistics
- Total depressions: 24
- Total fatalities: Unknown
- Total damage: Unknown

Related articles
- 1921 Atlantic hurricane season; 1920–24 Pacific hurricane seasons; 1920s North Indian Ocean cyclone seasons

In 1921, there were 24 tropical cyclones in the western Pacific Ocean.

== 1922 ==
1920–1935 Pacific typhoon seasons

Seasonal boundaries
- First system formed: March 25, 1922
- Last system dissipated: November 17, 1922

Strongest storm
- Name: "Swatow"
  - Maximum winds: 155 km/h (100 mph) (10-minute sustained)
  - Lowest pressure: 932 hPa (mbar)

Seasonal statistics
- Total depressions: 24
- Total fatalities: >100,000
- Total damage: Unknown

Related articles
- 1922 Atlantic hurricane season; 1920–24 Pacific hurricane seasons; 1920s North Indian Ocean cyclone seasons

In 1922, there were 24 tropical cyclones in the western Pacific Ocean.

=== Shantou typhoon ===
- Typhoon (JMA)
- Category 4 typhoon (SSHWS)
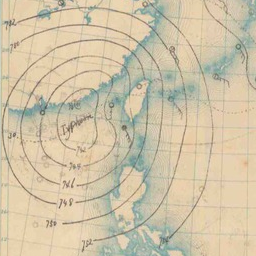
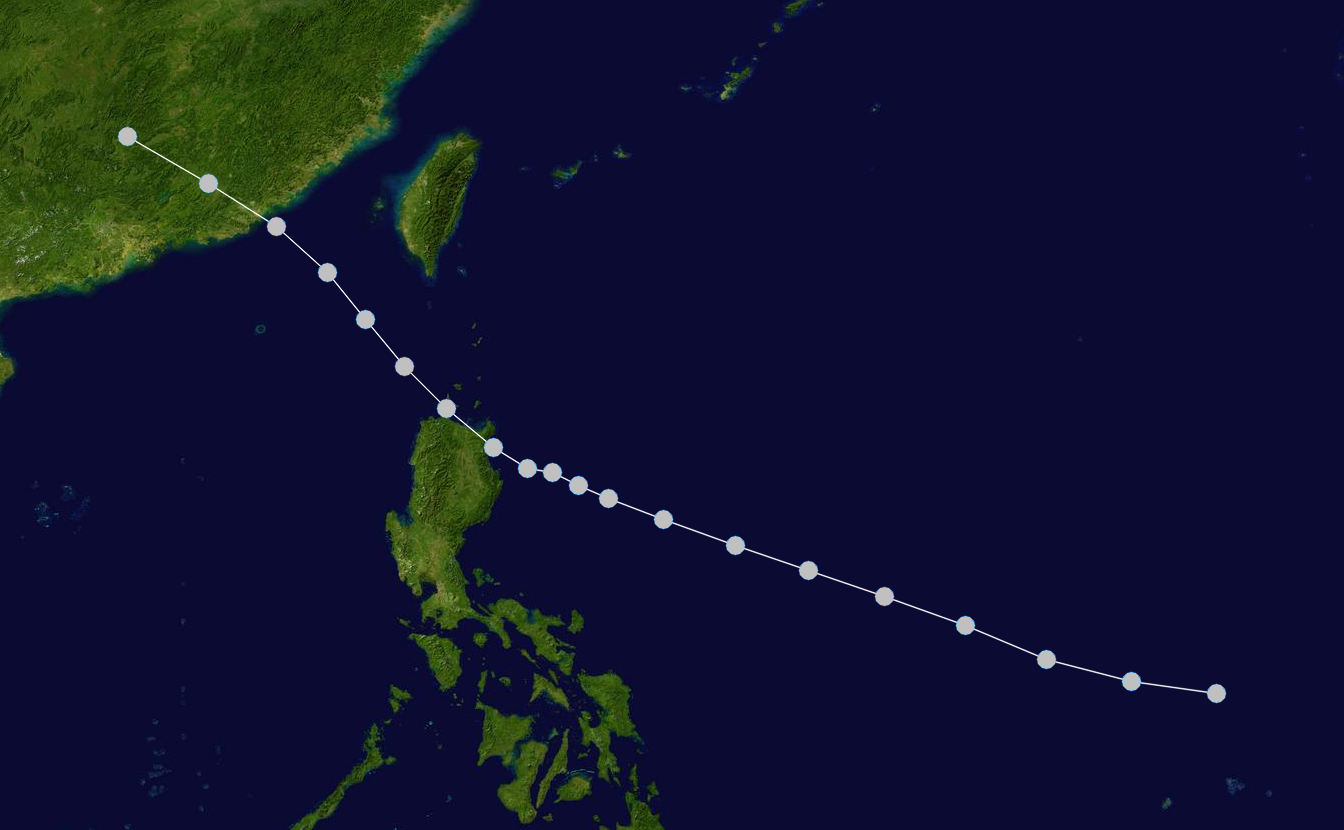
- Duration: July 27 – August 3
- Peak intensity: 220 km/h (140 mph) (1-min); ≤932 hPa (mbar)

On July 27, a typhoon struck southwestern China near Shantou, killing an estimated 100,000 people.

== 1923 ==
1920–1935 Pacific typhoon seasons

Seasonal boundaries
- First system formed: January 24, 1923
- Last system dissipated: December 5, 1923

Seasonal statistics
- Total depressions: 26
- Total fatalities: 3,100
- Total damage: $10 million (1923 USD)

Related articles
- 1923 Atlantic hurricane season; 1920–24 Pacific hurricane seasons; 1920s North Indian Ocean cyclone seasons

In 1923, there were 26 tropical cyclones in the western Pacific Ocean.

Two typhoons caused heavy damage in the Philippines in June. The first was during the beginning where it impacted Southern Luzon, and the second during the end of June where it impacted Northern Luzon.

On August 12, a typhoon struck China, killing 100 people around Hong Kong.

In September, a typhoon struck the Japanese island of Honshu, killing 3,000 people and leaving US$10 million in damage.

== 1924 ==
1920–1935 Pacific typhoon seasons

Seasonal boundaries
- First system formed: May 24, 1924
- Last system dissipated: December 23, 1924

Seasonal statistics
- Total depressions: 25
- Total fatalities: Unknown
- Total damage: Unknown

Related articles
- 1924 Atlantic hurricane season; 1920–24 Pacific hurricane seasons; 1920s North Indian Ocean cyclone seasons

In 1924, there were 25 tropical cyclones in the western Pacific Ocean.

== 1925 ==
1920–1935 Pacific typhoon seasons

Seasonal boundaries
- First system formed: April 14, 1925
- Last system dissipated: December 20, 1925

Seasonal statistics
- Total depressions: 22
- Total fatalities: Unknown
- Total damage: Unknown

Related articles
- 1925 Atlantic hurricane season; 1925 Pacific hurricane season; 1920s North Indian Ocean cyclone seasons

In 1925, there were 22 tropical cyclones in the western Pacific Ocean.

On October, moving east-northeastwards from the South China Sea, a small but severe typhoon impacted the Philippines.

== 1926 ==
1920–1935 Pacific typhoon seasons

Seasonal boundaries
- First system formed: January 29, 1926
- Last system dissipated: December 7, 1926

Seasonal statistics
- Total depressions: 19
- Total fatalities: Unknown
- Total damage: Unknown

Related articles
- 1926 Atlantic hurricane season; 1926 Pacific hurricane season; 1920s North Indian Ocean cyclone seasons

In 1926, there were 19 tropical cyclones in the western Pacific Ocean.

== 1928 ==
1920–1935 Pacific typhoon seasons

Seasonal boundaries
- First system formed: May 3, 1928
- Last system dissipated: November 30, 1928

Seasonal statistics
- Total depressions: 22
- Total fatalities: Unknown
- Total damage: Unknown

Related articles
- 1928 Atlantic hurricane season; 1928 Pacific hurricane season; 1920s North Indian Ocean cyclone seasons

In 1928, there were 22 tropical cyclones in the western Pacific Ocean.

== 1929 ==
1920–1935 Pacific typhoon seasons

Seasonal boundaries
- First system formed: January 19, 1929
- Last system dissipated: December 10, 1929

Seasonal statistics
- Total depressions: 22
- Total fatalities: Unknown
- Total damage: Unknown

Related articles
- 1929 Atlantic hurricane season; 1929 Pacific hurricane season; 1920s North Indian Ocean cyclone seasons

In 1929, there were 22 tropical cyclones in the western Pacific Ocean.

== 1930 ==
1920–1935 Pacific typhoon seasons

Seasonal boundaries
- First system formed: January 30, 1930
- Last system dissipated: December 7, 1930

Seasonal statistics
- Total depressions: 25
- Total fatalities: Unknown
- Total damage: Unknown

Related articles
- 1930 Atlantic hurricane season; 1930 Pacific hurricane season; 1930s North Indian Ocean cyclone seasons

In 1930, there were 25 tropical cyclones in the western Pacific Ocean.

== 1932 ==
1920–1935 Pacific typhoon seasons

Seasonal boundaries
- First system formed: January 3, 1932
- Last system dissipated: December 7, 1932

Seasonal statistics
- Total depressions: 27
- Total fatalities: Unknown
- Total damage: Unknown

Related articles
- 1932 Atlantic hurricane season; 1932 Pacific hurricane season; 1930s North Indian Ocean cyclone seasons

In 1932, there were 27 tropical cyclones in the western Pacific Ocean.

In late April, a typhoon moved across the Sulu Archipelago in the southern Philippines, killing 147 people.

== 1933 ==
1920–1935 Pacific typhoon seasons

Seasonal boundaries
- First system formed: April 21, 1933
- Last system dissipated: November 12, 1933

Seasonal statistics
- Total depressions: 29
- Total fatalities: Unknown
- Total damage: Unknown

Related articles
- 1933 Atlantic hurricane season; 1933 Pacific hurricane season; 1930s North Indian Ocean cyclone seasons

In 1933, there were 29 tropical cyclones in the western Pacific Ocean.

== 1934 ==
1920–1935 Pacific typhoon seasons

Seasonal boundaries
- First system formed: April 13, 1934
- Last system dissipated: December 15, 1934

Seasonal statistics
- Total depressions: 29
- Total fatalities: 3,155
- Total damage: $300 million (1934 USD)

Related articles
- 1934 Atlantic hurricane season; 1934 Pacific hurricane season; 1930s North Indian Ocean cyclone seasons

In 1934, there were 29 tropical cyclones in the western Pacific Ocean.

=== Luzon typhoon ===
In July, a typhoon killed four people when it struck Luzon in the Philippines.

=== Samar typhoon ===
Another typhoon in November struck Samar, killing 85 people.

=== Muroto typhoon ===
- Typhoon (JMA)
- Category 5 super typhoon (SSHWS)
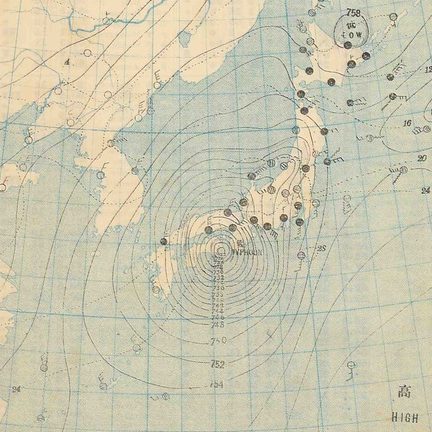
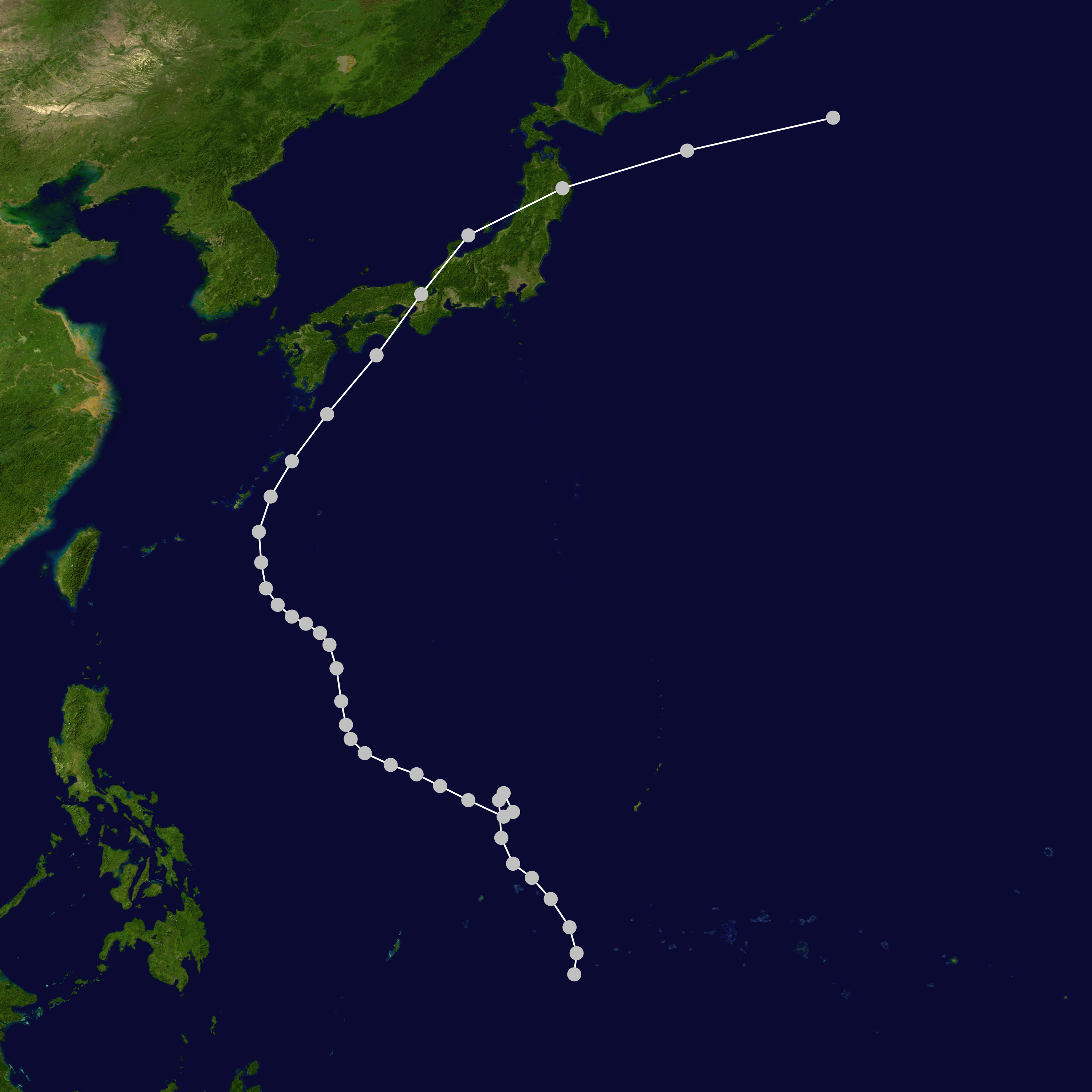
- Duration: September 13 – September 25
- Peak intensity: 260 km/h (160 mph) (1-min); 911.9 hPa (mbar)

In September, a typhoon struck Muroto, killing 3,066 people and leaving US$300 million in damage.

=== Philippines typhoon ===
In October, another typhoon impacted Philippines. It killed five people and caused property damages in Manila.

== See also ==
- 1900–1940 South Pacific cyclone seasons
- 1900–1950 South-West Indian Ocean cyclone seasons
- 1920s Australian region cyclone seasons
- 1930s Australian region cyclone seasons
