= 1920 Atlantic hurricane season =

- Season summary map

Seasonal boundaries
- First system formed: September 7, 1920
- Last system dissipated: October 27, 1920

Strongest storm
- By maximum sustained winds: One
  - Maximum winds: 110 mph (175 km/h) (1-minute sustained)
  - Lowest pressure: 985 mbar (hPa; 29.09 inHg)
- By central pressure: Two
  - Maximum winds: 100 mph (155 km/h) (1-minute sustained)
  - Lowest pressure: 975 mbar (hPa; 28.79 inHg)

Seasonal statistics
- Total storms: 5
- Hurricanes: 4
- Total fatalities: 1 direct, 2 indirect
- Total damage: ≥ $1.45 million (1920 USD)

Related articles
- 1920–24 Pacific hurricane seasons; 1920–1937 Pacific typhoon seasons; 1920s North Indian Ocean cyclone seasons

The 1920 Atlantic hurricane season featured tropical storms and hurricanes only in the month of September. (The present-day delineation of the Atlantic hurricane season is June 1 to November 30.) The first system, a hurricane, developed on September 7 while the last, a tropical depression, transitioned into an extratropical cyclone on October 27. Of note, four of the six cyclones co-existed with another tropical cyclone during the season.

Of the season's six tropical cyclones, five became tropical storms and four strengthened into hurricanes. Furthermore, none of these strengthened into a major hurricane—Category 3 or higher on the modern-day Saffir–Simpson hurricane wind scale—marking the seventh such occurrence since 1900. The strongest hurricane of the season peaked as only as a strong Category 2 with winds of 110 mph (180 km/h). The second hurricane caused one death and $1.45 million (1920 USD) in damage in Louisiana, the third left one fatality in North Carolina, and the fifth storm indirectly killed one person in Florida.

The season's activity was reflected with an accumulated cyclone energy (ACE) rating of 30, below the 1911–1920 average of 58.7. ACE is, broadly speaking, a measure of the power of the hurricane multiplied by the length of time it existed, so storms that last a long time, as well as particularly strong hurricanes, have high ACEs. It is only calculated for full advisories on tropical systems at or exceeding 39 mph (63 km/h), which is the threshold for tropical storm status.

== Systems ==
=== Hurricane One ===
- Category 2 hurricane (SSHWS)
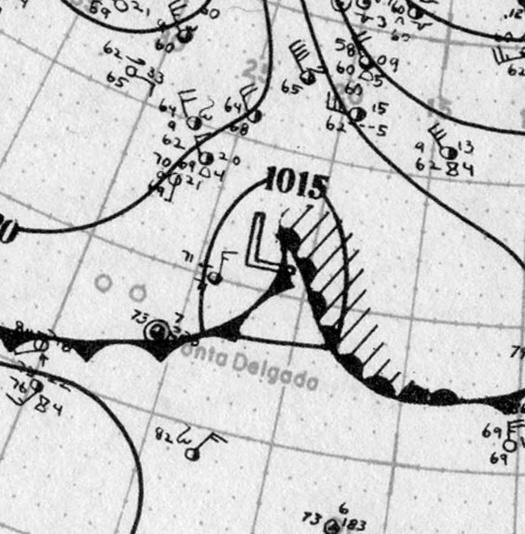
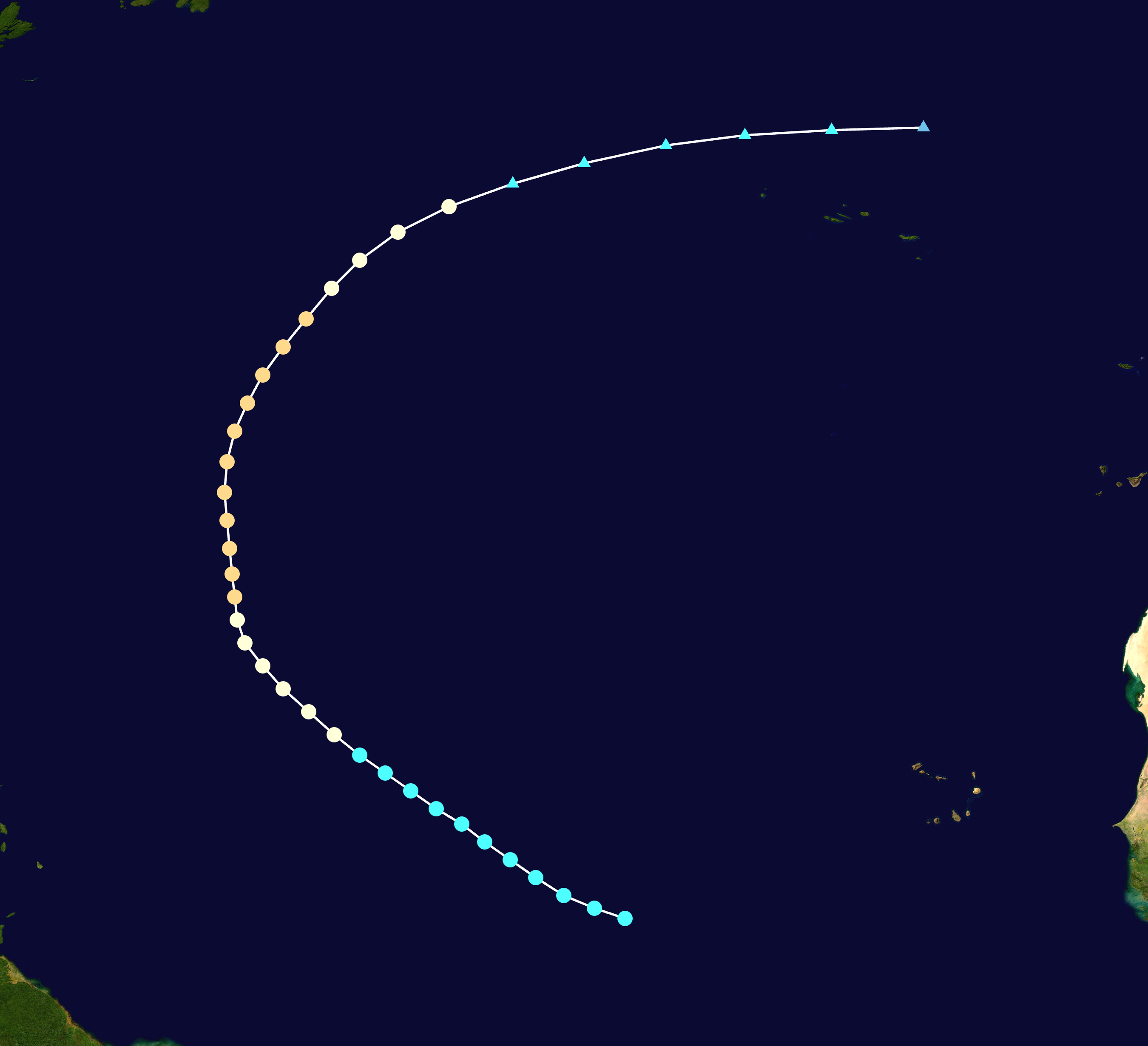
- Duration: September 7 – September 14
- Peak intensity: 110 mph (175 km/h) (1-min); <985 mbar (hPa)

The first known storm of the season was initially identified on September 7 as a 40 mph (64 km/h) tropical storm over Atlantic Ocean. Traveling towards the northwest, the storm gradually intensified, attaining hurricane-status late on September 9. The following day, a ship in the vicinity of the storm recorded a pressure of 985 mbar (hPa), the lowest pressure recorded in relation to the storm. Around 1200 UTC, the hurricane turned towards the north and intensified into a modern-day Category 2 hurricane on the Saffir–Simpson scale early on September 11. The storm continued to intensify through September 12 when it reached its peak intensity with winds of 110 mph (180 km/h). After maintaining this intensity for 18 hours, the hurricane began to weaken as it turned towards the northwest. By 0000 UTC on September 14, the storm weakened to a Category 1 hurricane. The system began to undergo an extratropical transition, completing the process early the next day. The system tracked nearly due east before dissipating on September 16 to the north of the Azores islands.

=== Hurricane Two ===
- Category 2 hurricane (SSHWS)
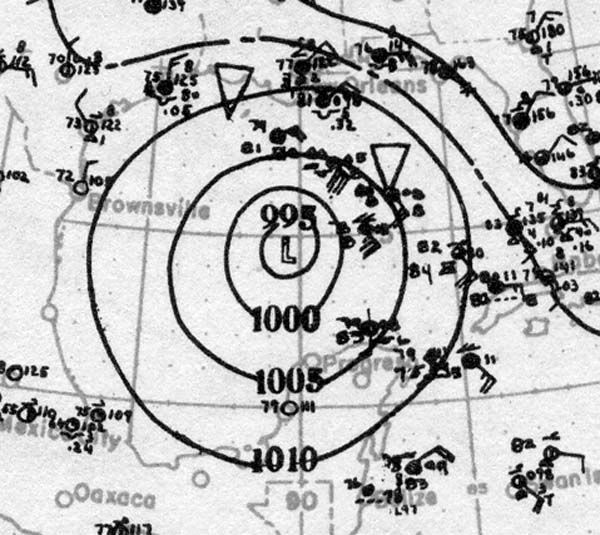
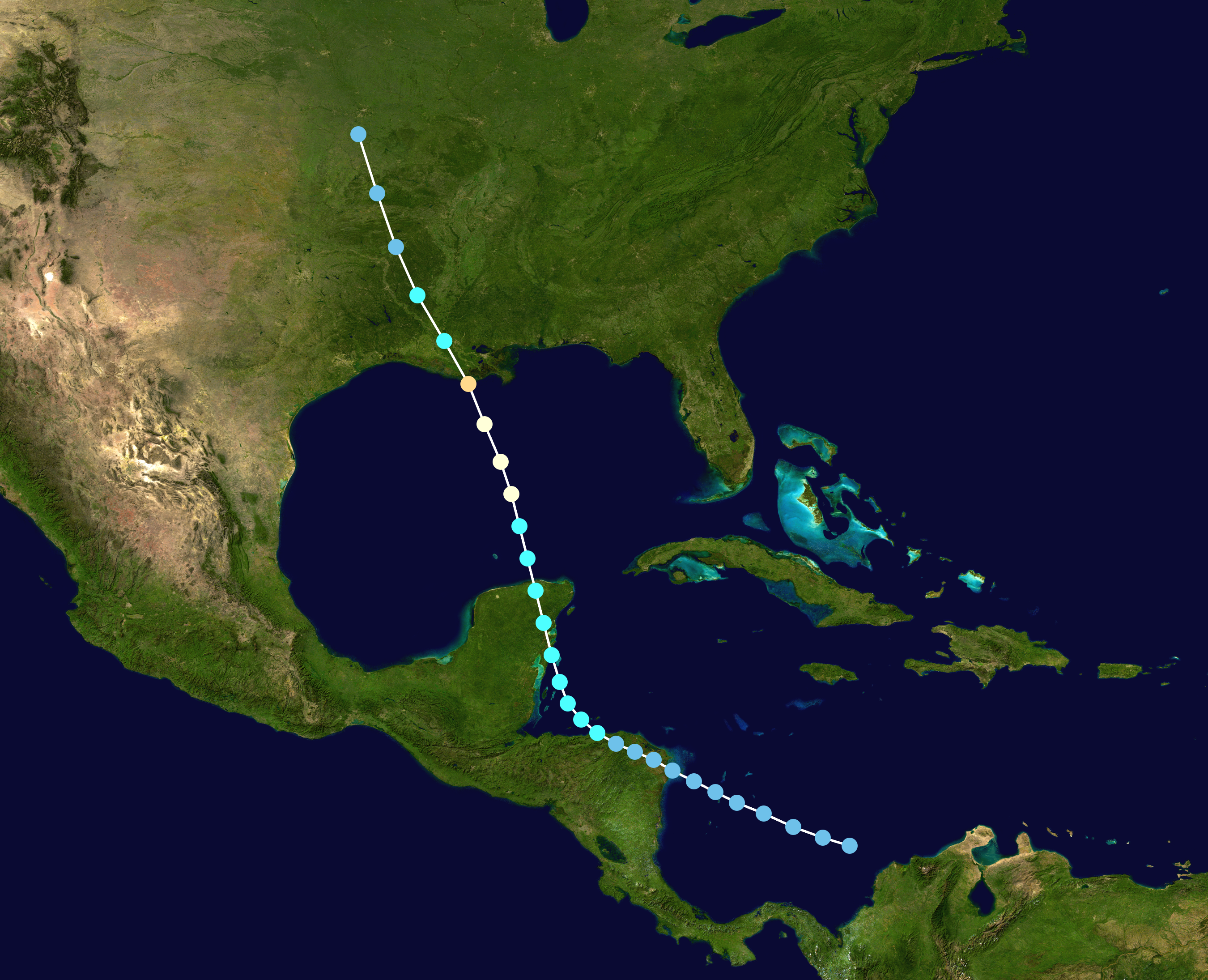
- Duration: September 16 – September 23
- Peak intensity: 100 mph (155 km/h) (1-min); 975 mbar (hPa)

The Louisiana Hurricane of 1920

An area of disturbed weather developed into a tropical depression northwest of Colombia on September 16. The system remained a weak tropical depression as it made landfall on Nicaragua, but later intensified to tropical storm strength as it moved across the Gulf of Honduras, prior to making a second landfall on the Yucatán Peninsula. Once in the Gulf of Mexico, the storm quickly intensified as it moved towards the north-northwest, reaching its peak intensity as a Category 2 hurricane with winds of 100 mph (160 km/h) prior to making landfall near Houma, Louisiana with no change in intensity. Afterwards, it quickly weakened over land, before dissipating on September 23 over eastern Kansas.

As it approached the United States Gulf Coast, the hurricane forced an estimated 4,500 people to evacuate off of Galveston Island, and numerous other evacuations and precautionary measures to occur. At landfall, the hurricane generated strong winds along a wide swath of the coast, uprooting trees and causing damage to homes and other infrastructure. Heavy rainfall associated with the storm peaked at 11.9 in (300 mm) in Robertsdale, Alabama. The heavy rains also washed out railroads, leading to several rail accidents. Across the Gulf Coast, one death was associated with the hurricane and damage from the storm totaled to $1.45 million (1920 USD).

=== Hurricane Three ===
- Category 1 hurricane (SSHWS)
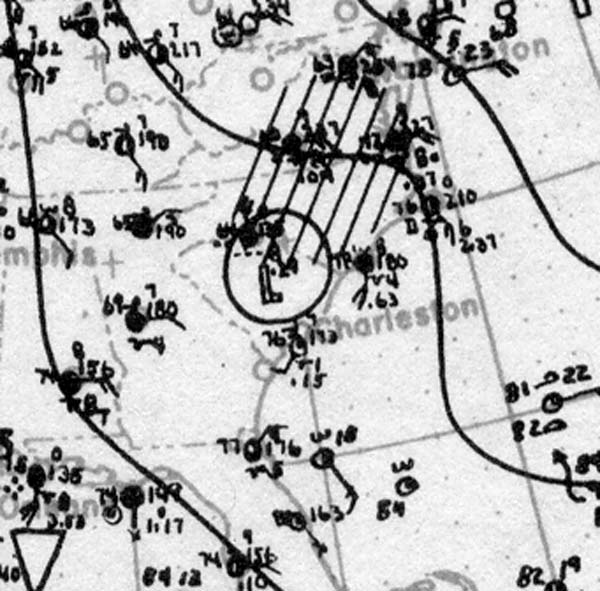
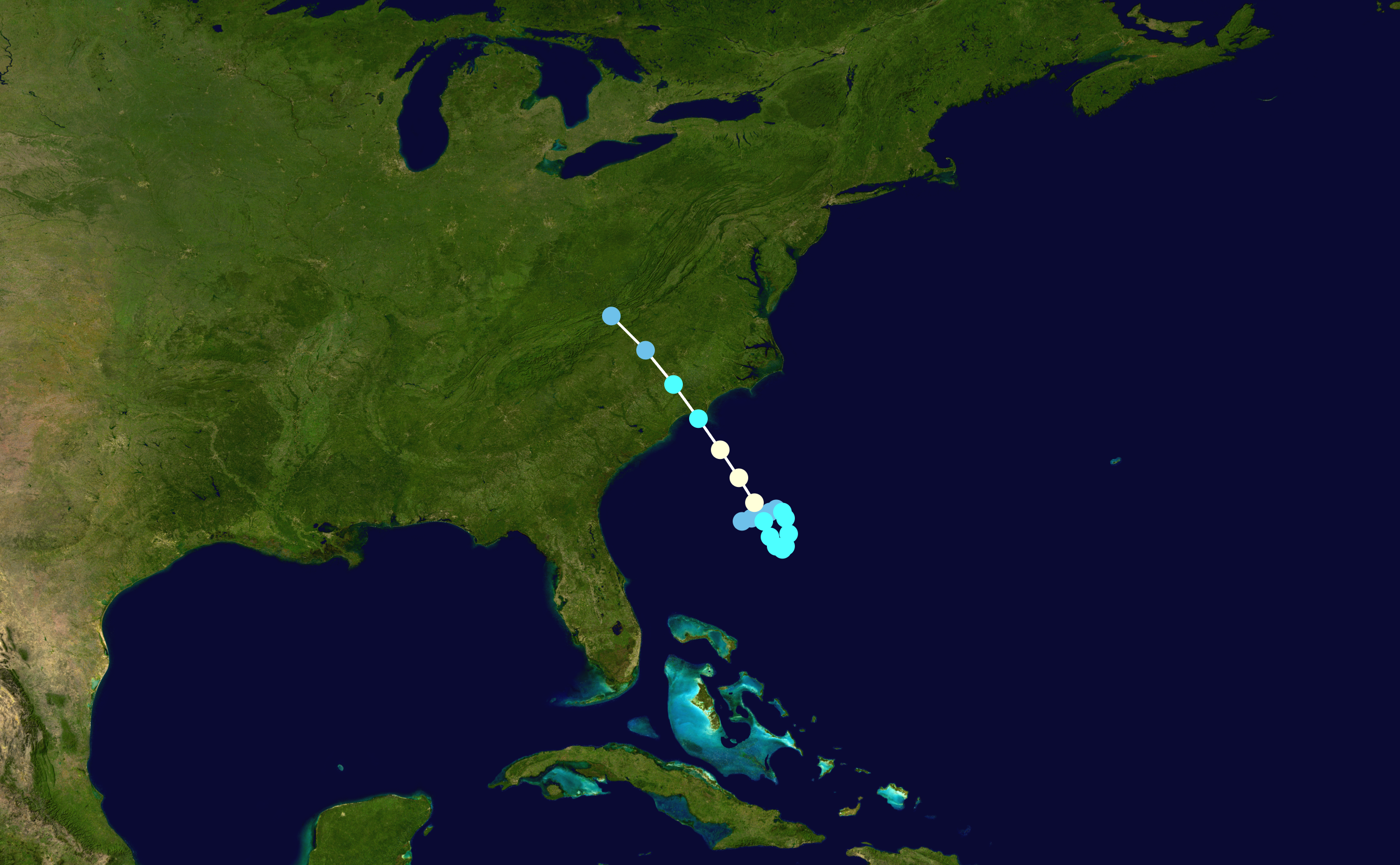
- Duration: September 19 – September 24
- Peak intensity: 85 mph (140 km/h) (1-min);

A low-pressure area developed into a tropical depression on September 19, while located about 245 mi (394 km) southeast of Awendaw, South Carolina. The system, which had an "extremely small diameter", moved in a slow cyclonic loop. Around 1200 UTC on September 20, the depression strengthened into a tropical storm. By midday on September 22, it continued the cyclonic loop while moving northwestward. The storm intensified into a Category 1 hurricane around that time. Maximum sustained winds peaked at 85 mph (137 km/h) late on September 22. However, the hurricane then began to weaken and fell to a strong tropical storm early the following day, at which time it made landfall near Cape Fear, North Carolina. The cyclone quickly weakened after moving inland and dissipated over western Virginia early on September 24.

Offshore Bald Head Island, North Carolina, a lightship was carried several miles from its original location and observed winds of 72 mph (116 km/h). Inland, a house in Wilmington was blown off its foundation and destroyed in, potentially a small tornado spawned by the cyclone. Many small severe windstorms were reported in Pitt County, where one person was killed, a number of people were injured, and several buildings were demolished.

=== Tropical Storm Four ===
- Tropical storm (SSHWS)
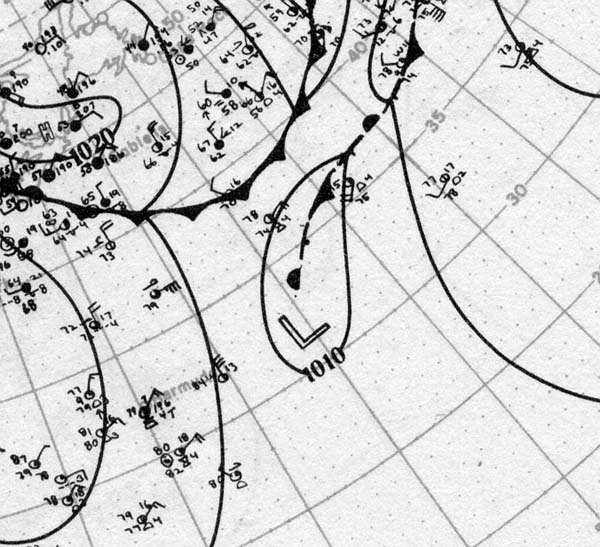
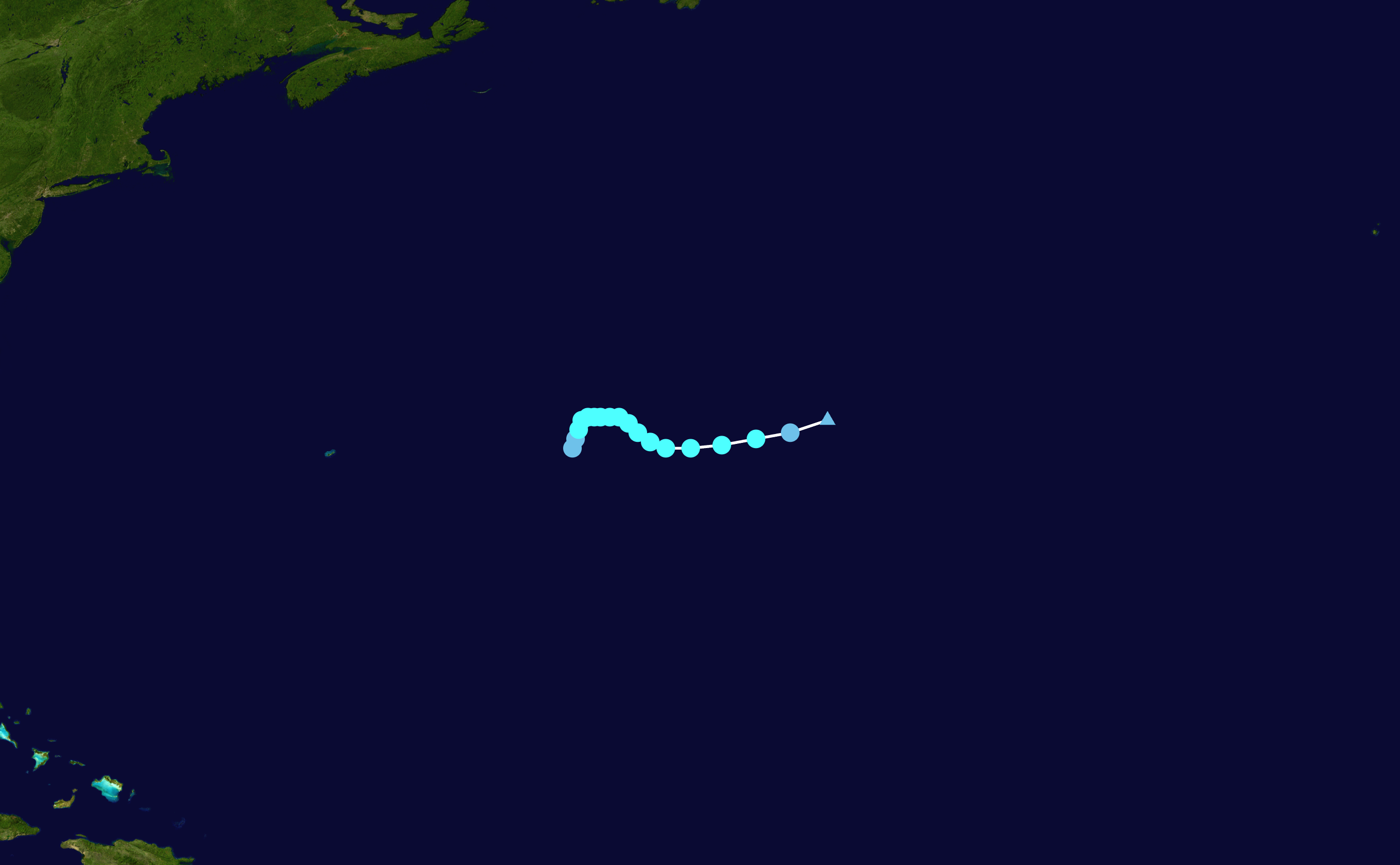
- Duration: September 23 – September 27
- Peak intensity: 45 mph (75 km/h) (1-min); <1009 mbar (hPa)

A tropical depression developed from a weak low-pressure area along a decaying stationary front about 450 mi (720 km) east of Bermuda around 1200 UTC on September 23. Based on ship observations, the system is estimated to have become a tropical storm early on September 24. The drifted slowly eastward for a few days and peaked with maximum sustained winds of 45 mph (72 km/h) later that day. Eventually, the system curved east-southeastward, but later continued its generally eastward motion at a faster forward speed. Around 1200 UTC on September 27, the storm weakened to a tropical depression, hours before being absorbed by a cold front. This storm was not operationally tracked in real time, but was later added to HURDAT based on weather maps and ship reports.

=== Hurricane Five ===
- Category 1 hurricane (SSHWS)
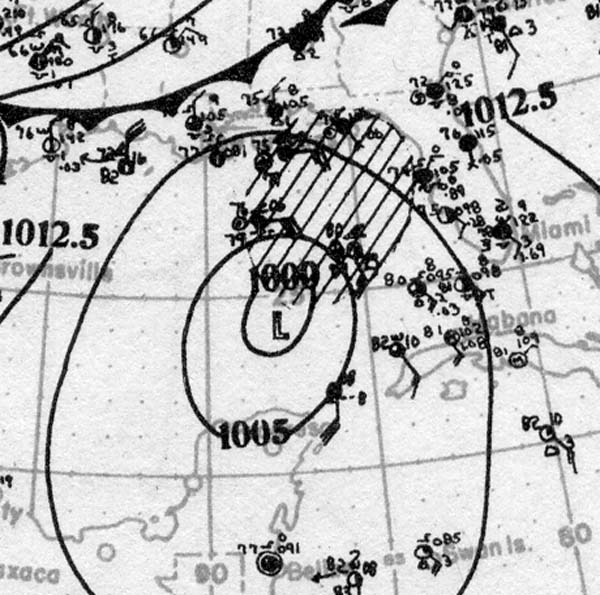
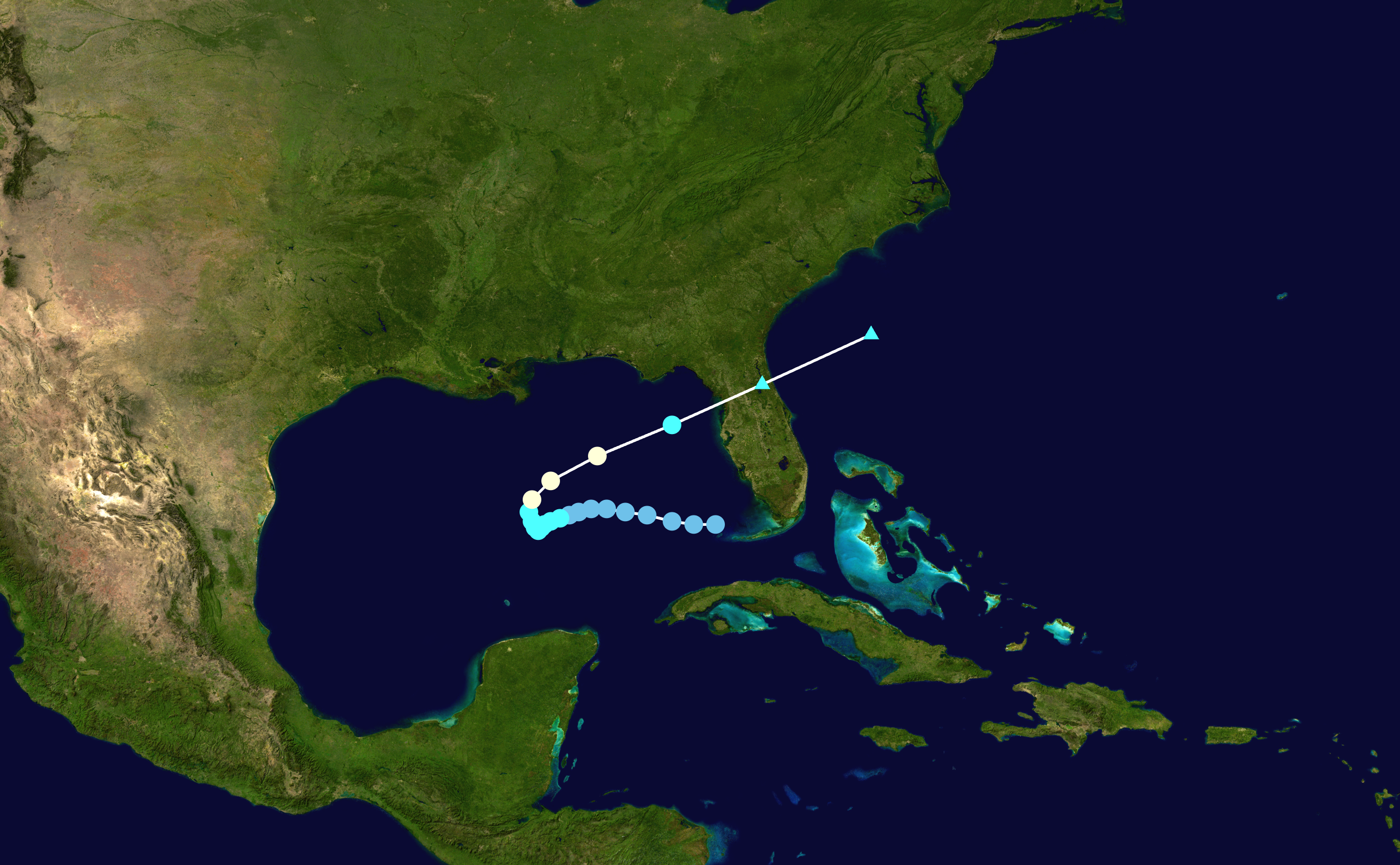
- Duration: September 25 – September 30
- Peak intensity: 85 mph (140 km/h) (1-min); <987 mbar (hPa)

A low-pressure area centered the Gulf of Mexico on September 25 and was designated as a tropical depression hours later. Turning west-southwestward, the storm gradually intensified, attaining tropical storm-status on September 27. The next day, the system nearly stalled close to the center of the Gulf of Mexico. On September 28, further development of the storm took place and ships in the vicinity of the storm reported a strong gale. The next day, the storm strengthened into a hurricane. Several hours later, nearby ship reported a pressure of 987 mbar (29.1 inHg), the lowest pressure associated with the hurricane. Around this time, the storm reached its peak intensity with winds of 85 mph (137 km/h); the storm also began to turn northeastward at this time. The hurricane then accelerated and began weakening. Early on September 30, the storm made landfall near Cedar Key, Florida, with winds up to 65 mph (105 km/h) before transitioning into an extratropical cyclone over Florida. Later that day, the remnants dissipated over the eastern Atlantic Ocean.

Although the storm weakened significantly before landfall, it caused severe damage along the immediate coastlines of western Florida. Low lands along the coast were inundated by storm surge and heavy rains, peaking at 8 in (200 mm). Crop lands were flooded, causing substantial damage to the fruit industry. One person was killed after being electrocuted by a downed wire in St. Petersburg. Several ships were also destroyed by the storm while docked along the coast.

=== Tropical Depression ===
On October 20, a westward moving tropical wave developed into a tropical depression about 165 mi (266 km) north-northeast of Barbuda. Trekking northwestward over the next three days, before curving northward in advance of an approaching frontal boundary. The depression peaked with maximum sustained winds of 35 mph (56 km/h) and a minimum barometric pressure of 1010 mbar (30 inHg). By October 25, it began merging with a cold front, finally being absorbed on October 27 about 590 mi (950 km) east-northeast of Bermuda.

== See also ==
- 1900–1940 South Pacific cyclone seasons
- 1900–1950 South-West Indian Ocean cyclone seasons
- 1920s Australian region cyclone seasons
