= 1927 Pacific typhoon season =

Seasonal boundaries
- First system formed: February 12, 1927
- Last system dissipated: December 19, 1927

Strongest storm
- Name: Eleven
  - Lowest pressure: 887 hPa (mbar)

Seasonal statistics
- Total depressions: 27
- Typhoons: 19
- Total fatalities: 20,952
- Total damage: $4 million (1927 USD)

Related articles
- 1927 Atlantic hurricane season; 1927 Pacific hurricane season; 1920s North Indian Ocean cyclone seasons

In 1927, there were 27 tropical cyclones observed in the western Pacific Ocean, north of the equator and west of the 180th meridian. Many of these storms affected the Philippines, China, and Japan, collectively leaving 15,952 fatalities. The strongest storm of the year also had the lowest barometric pressure recorded in a tropical cyclone worldwide at the time. On August 18, the Dutch steamship Sapoeroea recorded a barometric pressure of 886.7 millibar (26.185 inches of mercury) about 740 kilometres (460 miles) east of Luzon. This typhoon later struck near Hong Kong, where it halted transportation, wrecked buildings, and killed 15 people.

The first storm of the year originated near the Caroline Islands on February 12, which capsized the freighter Elkton and caused the loss of its crew of 36 people. Storms were observed in each subsequent month of the year. In May, a typhoon wrecked the passenger ferry SS Negros near the Philippine province of Romblon, killing 108 people. A typhoon in July killed around 10,000 people in China, mostly related to mountain flooding near Zhangzhou, leaving around 100,000 people homeless. A month later, another landfalling typhoon in China killed about 5,000 people and damaged nearly 20,000 houses. In September, an intense typhoon moved through Japan around the same time that an undersea earthquake affected the region; the concurrent disasters killed about 600 people, after a 3 metre (10 foot) tsunami washed away boats and houses along the coast. Another Chinese typhoon in September killed 5,000 people. The final storm of the year dissipated on December 19 to the west of the Philippines.

== Season summary ==
The Hong Kong Observatory (HKO) tracked 21 tropical systems during the year, then referred as "depressions". Of these storms, 19 were estimated to have attained typhoon status, which has maximum sustained winds of at least 119 km/h (74 mph). The HKO distributed storm warnings to 86 weather stations or officials, including by telephone for the first time. During the year, 11 tropical cyclones passed near the Philippines, of which seven crossed land; four of these were typhoons. The fewer than average storms in the archipelago resulted in lower than average rainfall in western Luzon. The Philippines government insurance fund claimed ₱16,149.25 in damages, mostly related to a radio station that was destroyed in Baler.

== Systems ==
=== February–June ===
The first tropical cyclone observed in 1927 was noted on February 12 southeast of Yap in the Caroline Islands. It moved west-northwestward, passing near Ngulu Atoll on February 14. The storm was last observed on February 16 after recurving to the northeast. Yap recorded a barometric pressure of 986 mbar (29.1 inHg), suggesting that the storm was a typhoon. On February 15, the freighter Elkton sent a distress signal amid the storm about 870 km (540 mi) northwest of Guam. By the time the S.S. Liberator arrived the next day, it only observed a 520 km^{2} (200 mi^{2}) oil patch; this suggested that the ship, its crew of 36 people, and the $1 million worth of sugar aboard, had capsized. The United States Navy deployed four destroyers from Manila, but was unable to find the wreckage.

A short-lived tropical cyclone was first observed on March 19, east of Mindanao in the Philippines. The system progressed northwestward through the Eastern Visayas, dissipating on March 20 over Masbate. On April 1, a tropical storm formed southwest of Taiwan, and progressed northeastward, passing between the island and the northern Philippines; the storm was last noted on April 4 south of Japan.

As early as May 22, a tropical cyclone existed east of the Philippine island of Samar. Tracking west-northwestward, the storm was at typhoon intensity when it struck eastern Luzon on May 26 near Baler, where a pressure of 994 mbar (29.4 inHg) was recorded. The center became disrupted while traversing the island, emerging into the South China Sea near Dagupan. It slowed to a northwest drift, dissipating on June 1 southeast of China. On May 28, the passenger ferry SS Negros foundered near Romblon during the typhoon, with the loss of 108 of the 178 people on board.

Another storm appeared east of the Philippines on May 26, located south of Yap. Initially, the system moved west-northwestward, passing over Palau, where 80% of houses were destroyed; damage was estimated at ¥400,000. The storm turned to the north-northwest, then later curved back to the west-northwest, reaching the Balintang Channel north of Luzon on June 2. That day, the town of Basco, Batanes in the waterway recorded a pressure of 973 mbar (28.7 inHg). On June 3, the storm crossed over Taiwan and recurved to the northeast. It was last noted on June 6 just south of the Japanese island of Kyushu.

=== July ===
A tropical cyclone was first noted on July 11 east of Luzon. It moved generally to the west-northwest for a few days before curving to the northwest. On July 15, the steamer Tjikandi encountered the typhoon, estimating winds of 160 km/h (99 mph); two quartermasters were washed overboard, and the railing and hatches were wrecked. On July 17, the typhoon struck southeastern Taiwan and moved across the southern portion of the island, where Hengchun recorded a barometric pressure of 978 mbar (28.9 inHg). Crossing the Taiwan Strait, the storm entered southeastern China near Xiamen on July 17, and dissipated the next day.

On July 20, a tropical cyclone developed east of Luzon and proceeded to the west-northwest. Three days later, the storm struck Isabela province in eastern Luzon. It moved northwestward once in the South China Sea, passing near Pratas Island. On July 25, the SS President Madison encountered the storm near the coast of China, reporting hurricane-force winds and a minimum pressure of 975 mbar (28.8 inHg). That day, the typhoon moved ashore near Hong Kong, where winds reached 116 km/h (72 mph). Also near Hong Kong, a Chinese junk sank, killing 191 people, while passengers were rescued by the steamer Wing On. The storm curved to the southwest over land, dissipating on July 27. Flooding along the Jiulong River killed 10,000 people by drowning, mostly in mountainous areas near Zhangzhou. The floods left another 100,000 people homeless, and caused $2 million in damages.

=== August ===
The August issue of the Monthly Weather Review journal noted a small typhoon west of the Ryukyu Islands from August 2–4, moving northward and "of no great importance." A tropical cyclone was first reported on August 6 east of Luzon and north of Yap. It moved to the northwest, turned northeastward, and curved back to the northwest through the southern Ryukyu Islands. As it approached the eastern coast of China, the typhoon turned more to the north, and later crossed the Korean peninsula; it was last reported on August 10 off the east coast of the peninsula. Another storm originated north of Yap on August 11, and moved generally to the northwest. On August 16, the typhoon struck southeastern Taiwan and crossed the island. The storm proceeded westward, crossed the Taiwan Strait, and moved ashore southeastern China, dissipating on August 17.

On August 13, a tropical cyclone was observed south of Guam. It moved west-northwestward and attained a great intensity. On August 18, the Dutch steamship Sapoeroea recorded a barometric pressure of 886.7 mbar (26.18 inHg) about 740 km (460 mi) east of Luzon. This was the lowest pressure recorded in a tropical cyclone at the time, until a Hurricane hunters plane released a dropsonde into Typhoon Ida in 1958 and recorded a pressure of 877 mbar (25.9 inHg). Early on August 19, the typhoon passed near Aparri in northern Luzon, which recorded a pressure of 969 mbar (28.6 inHg). The storm's strong winds affected Cagayan, Mountain, Ilocos Norte, and Ilocos Sur provinces. Progressing into the South China Sea, the typhoon approached within 16 km (9.9 mi) of Pratas Island on August 20, where Force 11 winds were recorded. Later that day, the storm passed about 95 km (59 mi) south of Hong Kong, where wind gusts reached 187 km/h (116 mph). In Cheung Sha Wan, the typhoon wrecked 120 buildings, and the entire shanty town in Kowloon Tong was ruined. Ferry and tram service was halted, and a bus was overturned on Salisbury Road. Throughout Hong Kong, 11 boats were wrecked, 15 people were killed, and another 22 others were injured. Continuing across southern China, the storm was last observed on August 22.

As early as August 19, a tropical cyclone was near and south of Guam. Its track curved from the west-northwest to the north, drifting at times west of the Marianas Islands. The typhoon turned to the northwest, and was nearing the Ryukyu Islands on August 27. Turning westward and later to the west-southwest, the storm moved across Taiwan moved into the South China Sea. The typhoon moved ashore southern China in Guangdong on or after August 30 to the west of Hong Kong. In the province, the typhoon and its accompanying waves killed 5,000 people. More than 20,000 homes were damaged, and around 400 boats were wrecked, estimated at US$1 million in damage.

The final August storm also originated near Guam on August 25. It moved to the northwest and intensified into a typhoon, later turning northeast and remaining south of Japan. The storm was last noted on September 2 to the east of Japan.

=== September ===
A typhoon was first observed on September 9 northeast of the Philippines. Passing Guam two days later, its northward track shifted to the northeast toward Japan. The typhoon struck Kyushu on September 13, described in the Monthly Weather Review as the "most severe felt there in recent years." Around the same time, an underwater earthquake affected the region, which produced a 3.0 m (10 ft) tsunami that washed away buildings along the coast and carried boats two miles inland. Newspapers reported nearly 600 fatalities during the typhoon and earthquake. River flooding in Ōmura inundated 5,000 houses, leaving 15,000 people homeless. The storm ruined rice fields, causing prices to increase. Across Kyushu, the typhoon flooded or wrecked the roofs of thousands of homes. The typhoon moved through southern Japan and was last noted on September 15 nearing the Kuril Islands.

A typhoon approached eastern Luzon on September 16, and moved across the island on the next day. In the municipality of Baler on the east coast, a minimum pressure of 969 mbar (28.6 inHg) was recorded. The typhoon's eye passed over and nearly destroyed the town. A tornado spawned by the typhoon hit Metro Manila. The typhoon progressed westward into the South China Sea, later curving to the northwest and entering the Gulf of Tonkin near the island of Hainan. After the storm, the Philippine government provided aid to residents.

On September 20, a tropical cyclone was observed south off Guam, which proceeded northward through the Northern Marianas Islands. It turned to the northwest, but curved to the northeast by September 22. Passing south of Japan, the storm was last observed two days later. Another storm was observed on September 23 to the south of the Ryukyu Islands. It moved to the northeast at first before executing a loop in its track, passing through the Ryukyu Islands. The storm progressed to the northeast, remaining south of Japan, and was last noted on September 29. The final storm of the month was first observed on September 29 near Guam. Moving generally to the northwest at first, it turned to the northeast on September 30 and was last observed two days later to the southeast of Japan. While near the Bonin Islands, a station recorded a minimum pressure of 989 mbar (29.2 inHg).

On September 26, a typhoon struck China, killing about 5,000 people.

=== October–December ===
A typhoon was first observed southwest of Guam on October 1, which progressed steadily westward. On October 4, the storm crossed the Philippines, entering from Borongan in Eastern Samar to Capiz and into the South China Sea. Heavy damage occurred along the path, and several boats were wrecked in Capiz, resulting in several fatalities. The island of Mindoro lost communications with Manila during the storm. Shifting to the west-northwest, the storm moved ashore eastern Vietnam on October 8 near Danang. Another typhoon followed a similar path, originating near Guam on October 4 and progressing westward. Five days later, the storm struck the Philippine province of Camarines Norte, causing damage as it moved westward through Luzon. Moving across the South China Sea, the storm struck the east coast of what was then Indochina on October 11.

A typhoon was observed on October 13 east of Guam, which moved generally northwestward for three days; then, it recurved to the northeast, and was last reported on October 18. Another typhoon originated southeast of Guam on October 19. It moved generally westward toward the Philippines before curving more to the north on October 24. The track shifted to the northeast, and the typhoon passed between Japan and the Bonin Islands. It was last observed on October 30.

On November 17, a typhoon originated west of Guam, which moved slowly to the west or west-northwest. It approached the eastern Philippines but remained east of the island group. On November 22, the typhoon curved to the northeast, remaining south of Japan. Another storm appeared on November 22 to the northwest of the previous storm, just to the northeast of Samar. It moved northwestward at first, but recurved to the northeast away from Luzon, and was last reported on November 24. On that same day, a typhoon was observed southeast of Guam and proceeded westward. The storm passed near Yap on November 25 and later turned to the north. Two days later, a passing United States Navy ship encountered the storm. On November 29, a storm passed near the Bonin Islands, but it was uncertain whether it was the first typhoon of the month near the Philippines or the storm that affected Yap. This storm was last observed on November 30.

A storm appeared west of Yap on December 3. Moving to the west-northwest, it crossed through the Visayas and Mindoro islands in the central Philippines. In the South China Sea, the storm trekked to the west-southwest and was last noted on December 9. The final system of the season originated on December 18 southeast of Zamboanga in the southern Philippines. It moved to the northwest and a day later dissipated in the Sulu Sea.

== See also ==
- 1927 Atlantic hurricane season
- 1927 Pacific hurricane season
- 1920s North Indian Ocean cyclone seasons
- 1900–1950 South-West Indian Ocean cyclone seasons
- 1920s Australian region cyclone seasons
- 1900–1940 South Pacific cyclone seasons
