= 1934 Pacific hurricane season =

Seasonal boundaries
- First system formed: July 8, 1934
- Last system dissipated: October 16, 1934

Strongest storm
- Name: Four
  - Lowest pressure: 956 mbar (hPa; 28.23 inHg)

Seasonal statistics
- Total storms: 4
- Hurricanes: 3
- Total fatalities: Unknown
- Total damage: Unknown

Related articles
- 1934 Atlantic hurricane season; 1934 Pacific typhoon season; 1930s North Indian Ocean cyclone seasons

The 1934 Pacific hurricane season ran through the summer and fall of 1934. Before the satellite age started in the 1960s, data on east Pacific hurricanes was extremely unreliable. Most east Pacific storms were of no threat to land.

== Systems ==
=== Possible Tropical Cyclone One ===
A possible tropical cyclone, with a ship-reported pressure of 29.53 inHg (100.0 kPa), was located southwest of Acapulco from July 8 to 9.

=== Possible Hurricane Two ===
On July 18, a possible hurricane existed north of Cape Corrientes.

=== Hurricane Three ===
Somewhere south of Acapulco, a tropical cyclone formed on September 16. It headed along the coast, not strengthening much until September 18. It was a hurricane by September 19. For the next three days, it slowly moved through the area south of the Gulf of California. It had weakened to a depression by September 22, whence it made landfall on the Baja California Peninsula and dissipated. The lowest pressure reported by a ship was 28.82 inHg (97.6 kPa).

This hurricane caused death and destruction throughout the southern part of the Baja California Peninsula. A large number of people were killed, and many were injured. The hurricane left twenty thousand people homeless and reduced to hunger. Damage was particularly heavy in La Paz, Triunfor, San Antonio, San Bartolo, Miraflores, San José del Cabo, and Cabo San Lucas. Electricity and water utilities were severely disrupted. The hurricane destroyed the area's tomato crop, and severely disrupted sugarcane plantations. It also destroyed a recently finished highway between La Paz and San Bartolo, and flooded mines near San Antonio and Triunfo. The total damage was estimated at 500,000,000 pesos (1934 MXP). The Mexican government sent aid to the affected area, along with the International Red Cross.

=== Hurricane Four ===
On October 14, well off the coast of Mexico, a tropical storm was noticed. It headed north towards the Gulf of California, and dissipated October 16. The cyclone was a hurricane, and a ship reported a pressure of 28.25 inHg (95.7 kPa).

== See also ==
- 1934 Atlantic hurricane season
- 1934 Pacific typhoon season
- 1930s North Indian Ocean cyclone seasons
- 1900–1940 South Pacific cyclone seasons
- 1900–1950 South-West Indian Ocean cyclone seasons
- 1930s Australian region cyclone seasons
