= 1934 Atlantic hurricane season =

- Season summary map

Seasonal boundaries
- First system formed: June 4, 1934
- Last system dissipated: November 30, 1934

Strongest storm
- Name: Thirteen
  - Maximum winds: 115 mph (185 km/h) (1-minute sustained)
  - Lowest pressure: 955 mbar (hPa; 28.2 inHg)

Seasonal statistics
- Total storms: 13
- Hurricanes: 7
- Major hurricanes (Cat. 3+): 1
- Total fatalities: 1,027+
- Total damage: $8.77 million (1934 USD)

Related articles
- 1934 Pacific hurricane season; 1920-1937 Pacific typhoon seasons; 1930s North Indian Ocean cyclone seasons

The 1934 Atlantic hurricane season produced thirteen tropical storms, of which seven further organized into hurricanes. Of those seven hurricanes, only one intensified into a major hurricane, which is a Category 3 or stronger system on the modern-day Saffir–Simpson scale. The first system developed on June 4 while the last storm dissipated on November 30. In 2012, as part of the Atlantic hurricane reanalysis project, meteorologists identified two previously unknown September tropical storms and fine-tuned the meteorological histories of many others. However, given scant observations from ships and weather stations, significant uncertainty of tropical cyclone tracks, intensity, and duration remains, particularly for those storms that stayed at sea.

In the United States, the 1934 hurricane season was significantly less destructive than the preceding year. Forecasters credited this feat to the Weather Bureau's advanced warning to persons in the path of advancing hurricanes. In Central America, however, the season's first hurricane wrought catastrophic rainfall resulting in an enormous loss of life, estimated somewhere between 1,000 and 3,000 people. The storm continued into the United States, killing 10 people and causing about $4.4 million (Note: All damage totals are in 1934 values of their respective currencies.) in damage. In July, a hurricane struck Texas, spawning tornadoes and generating storm surge, killing 19 people; damage was estimated around $4.5 million. In late August and early September, another hurricane meandered offshore Texas while a weak tropical storm struck North Carolina, each causing minor damage. Shortly thereafter, a hurricane curved up the U.S. East Coast, resulting in 8 fatalities and widespread impacts. A weak tropical storm affected the U.S. Gulf Coast in early October, and the season's only major hurricane meandered across the southwestern Atlantic at the end of November.

The season's total activity was reflected with an accumulated cyclone energy (ACE) rating of 48, well below the 1931–1943 average of 91.2. ACE is a metric used to express the energy used by a tropical cyclone during its lifetime. Therefore, a storm with a longer duration will have high values of ACE. It is only calculated at six-hour increments in which specific tropical and subtropical systems are either at or above sustained wind speeds of 39 mph (63 km/h), which is the threshold for tropical storm intensity. Thus, tropical depressions are not included here.

== Systems ==
=== Hurricane One ===
- Category 2 hurricane (SSHWS)
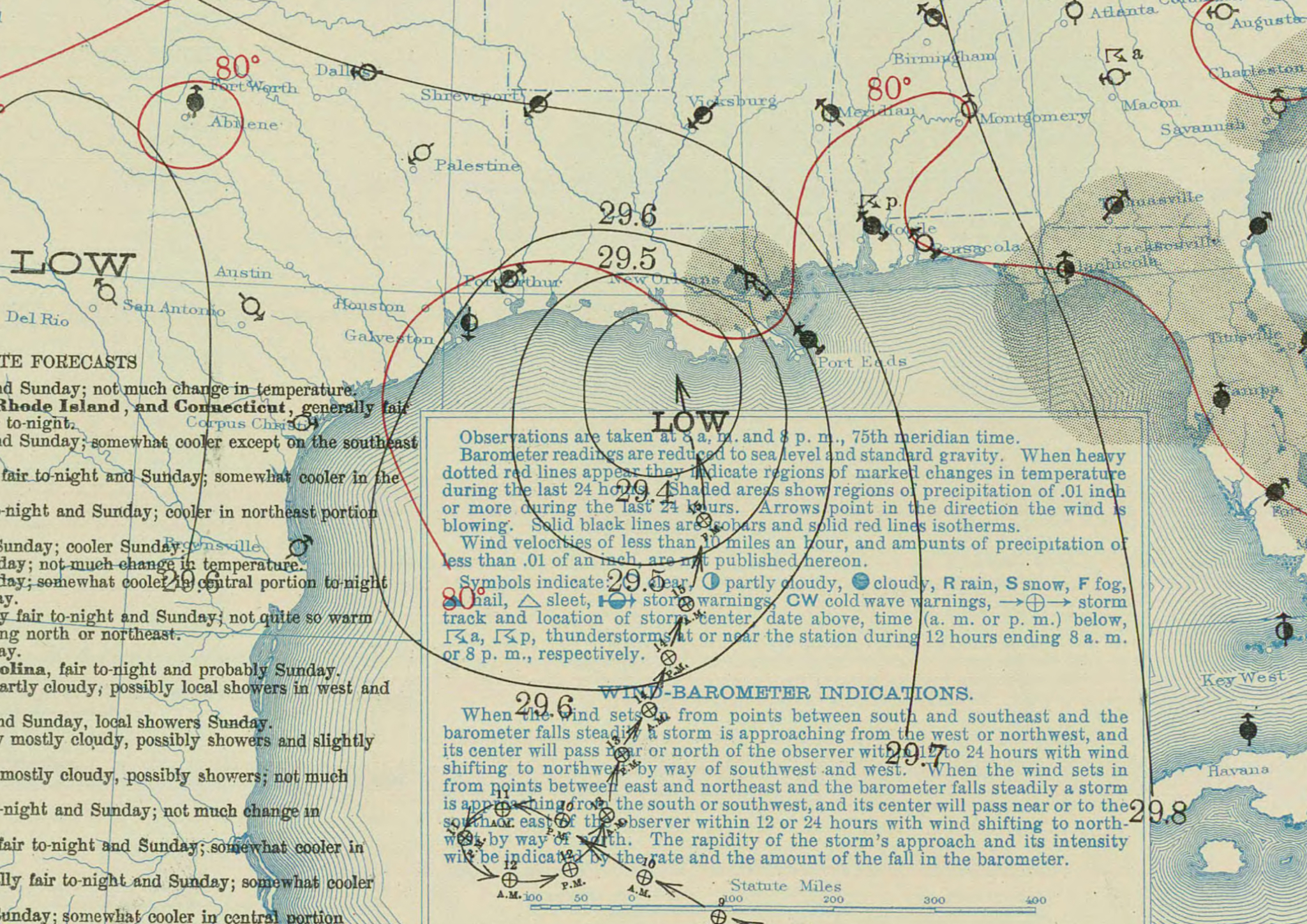
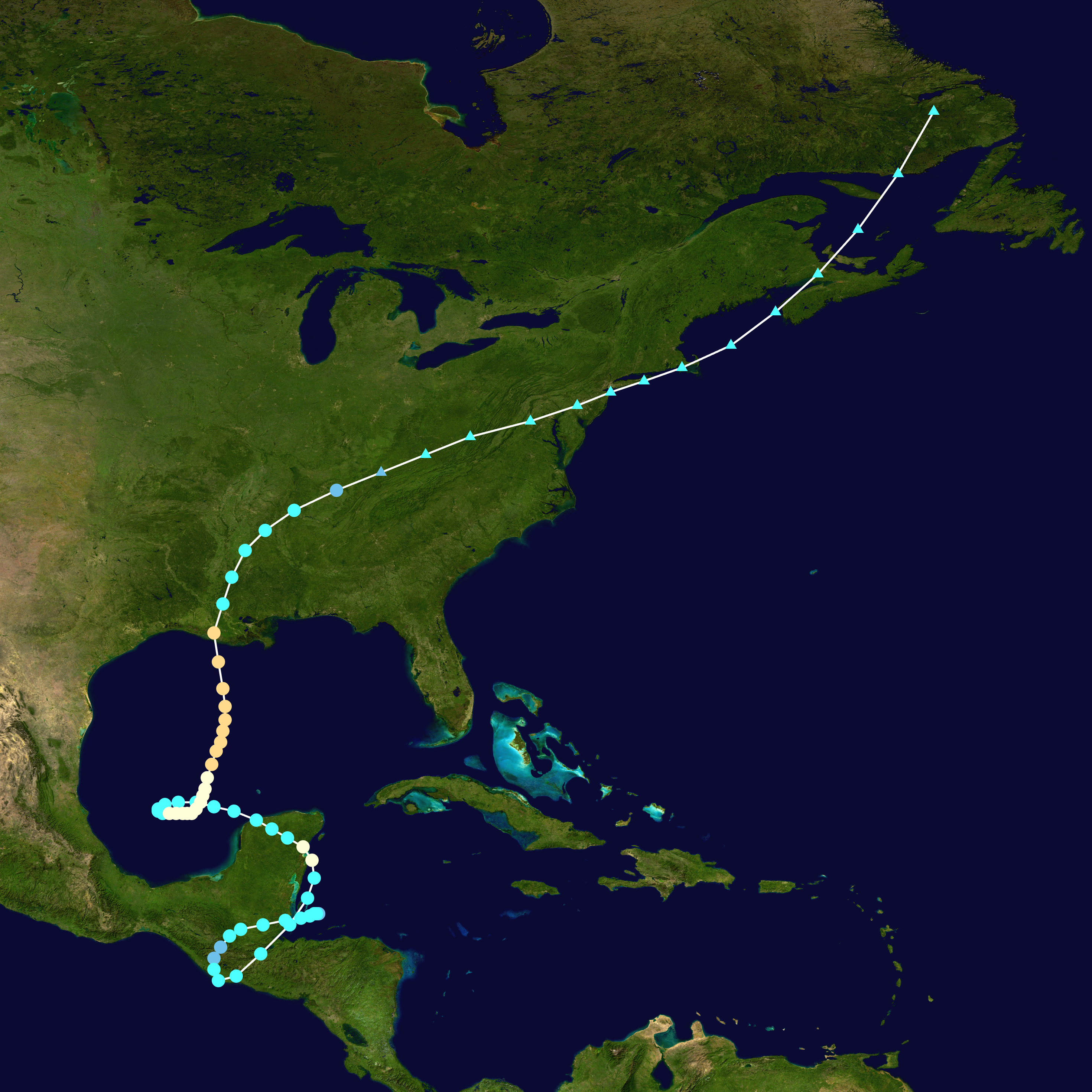
- Duration: June 4 – June 18
- Peak intensity: 100 mph (155 km/h) (1-min); 966 mbar (hPa)

A tropical depression formed over the Gulf of Honduras around 12:00 UTC on June 4. The system intensified into a tropical storm and reached winds of 50 mph (80 km/h) before striking near Belize City early on June 5. Once inland, it executed a cyclonic loop across the Mexican states of Guatemala and Chiapas before re-emerging into the Gulf of Honduras. The cyclone had weakened to a tropical depression while over land, but it restrengthened once offshore again and became a Category 1 hurricane with winds of 80 mph (130 km/h) before making landfall in extreme northern Belize early on June 9. The storm progressed across the Yucatán Peninsula in a weakened state but reacquired hurricane intensity as it made a second cyclonic loop over the Bay of Campeche. Now moving north, the hurricane reached peak winds of 100 mph (160 km/h) and maintained that strength through landfall near Jeanerette, Louisiana, at 19:00 UTC on June 16. It curved northeast once inland, losing tropical characteristics over central Tennessee after 06:00 UTC on June 18 but maintained its status as an extratropical cyclone until late on June 21, when it was located over Newfoundland and Labrador.

The cyclone proved to be catastrophic across El Salvador and western Honduras, where rainfall up to 25 in (640 mm) caused widespread flooding and one of the largest death tolls in the history of the Atlantic basin. Press reports indicated the number of fatalities ranged from 1,000 to 3,000, including 500 in the town of Ocotepeque alone. There, all structures but the town's church were reportedly demolished. The system produced hurricane-force winds across a portion of the Yucatán Peninsula before progressing into the United States. A 12 ft (3.7 m) storm surge inundated areas around Oyster Bayou, and boats were run aground along the coast. It brought winds up to 68 mph (109 km/h) in Morgan City, Louisiana, damaging structures. Officials with the United States Red Cross estimated that 75–150 homes were demolished, 1,500 others were left uninhabitable, and between 3,000 and 7,000 more were damaged to some degree by the storm. Rainfall totaled to 9.6 in (240 mm) in Lafayette; that city and Franklin, Melville, and Abbeville recorded daily rainfall records. The hurricane killed six people, caused $2.605 million in property damage, and incurred another $1.5 million in crop damage across Louisiana. Squalls from the system killed four people and injured many others in Mississippi, while heavy rainfall caused the Pearl River to exceed flood stage. Record rainfall during June in Tennessee, accumulating to 10 in (250 mm) in a matter of hours in Cedar Hill, caused about $250,000 in damage across the state. A small tornado struck north of Joelton and resulted in an additional $3,000 in damage. The extratropical remnants produced winds of 49 mph (79 km/h) in Atlantic City, New Jersey, and delivered needed rainfall throughout the region. Across Ontario and Quebec, heavy rains delayed traffic and congested storm sewers. High tension wires and poles were toppled, causing widespread power outages. Eleven barns were destroyed, and the Varennes lighthouse was put out of commission.

=== Hurricane Two ===
- Category 1 hurricane (SSHWS)
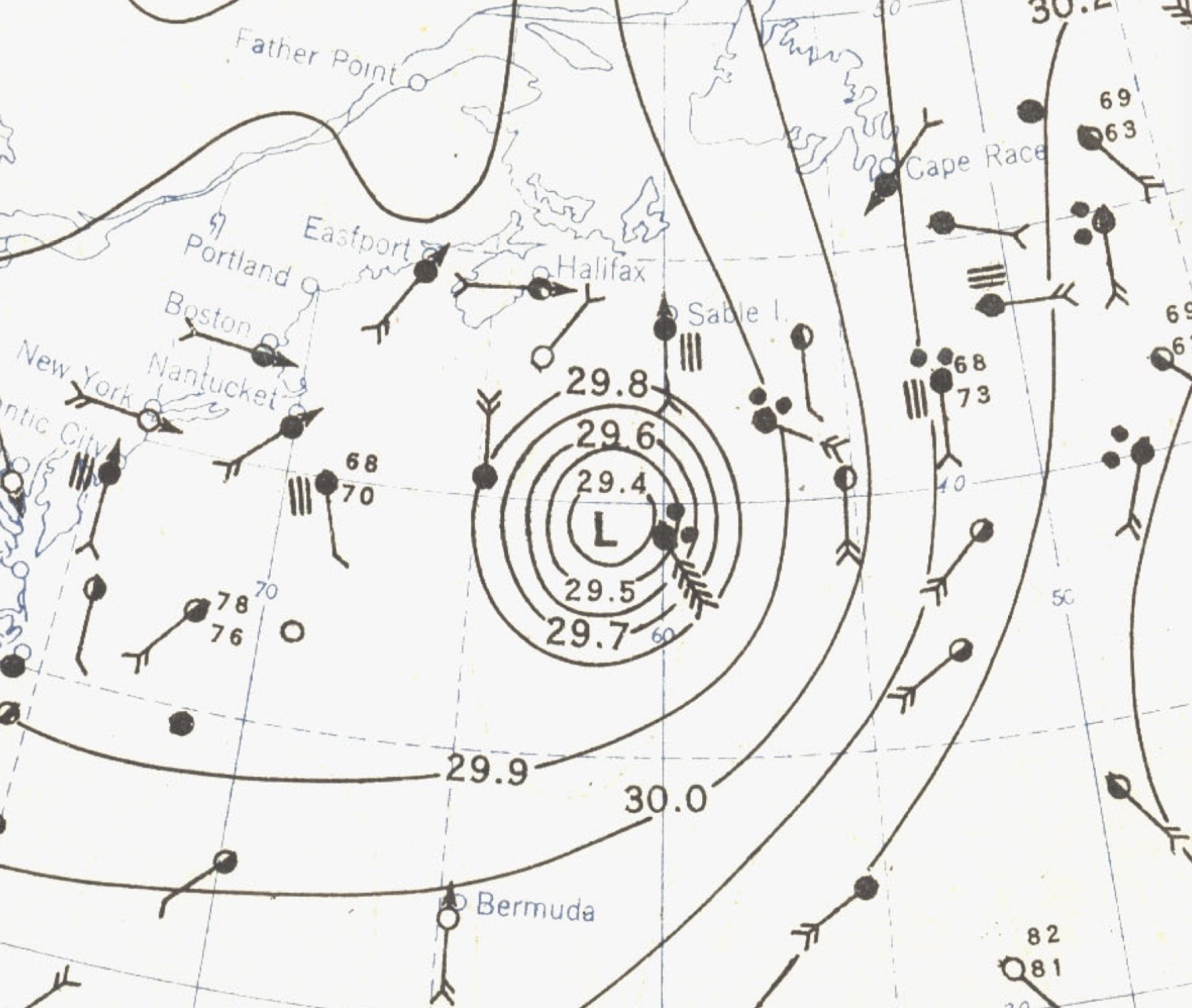
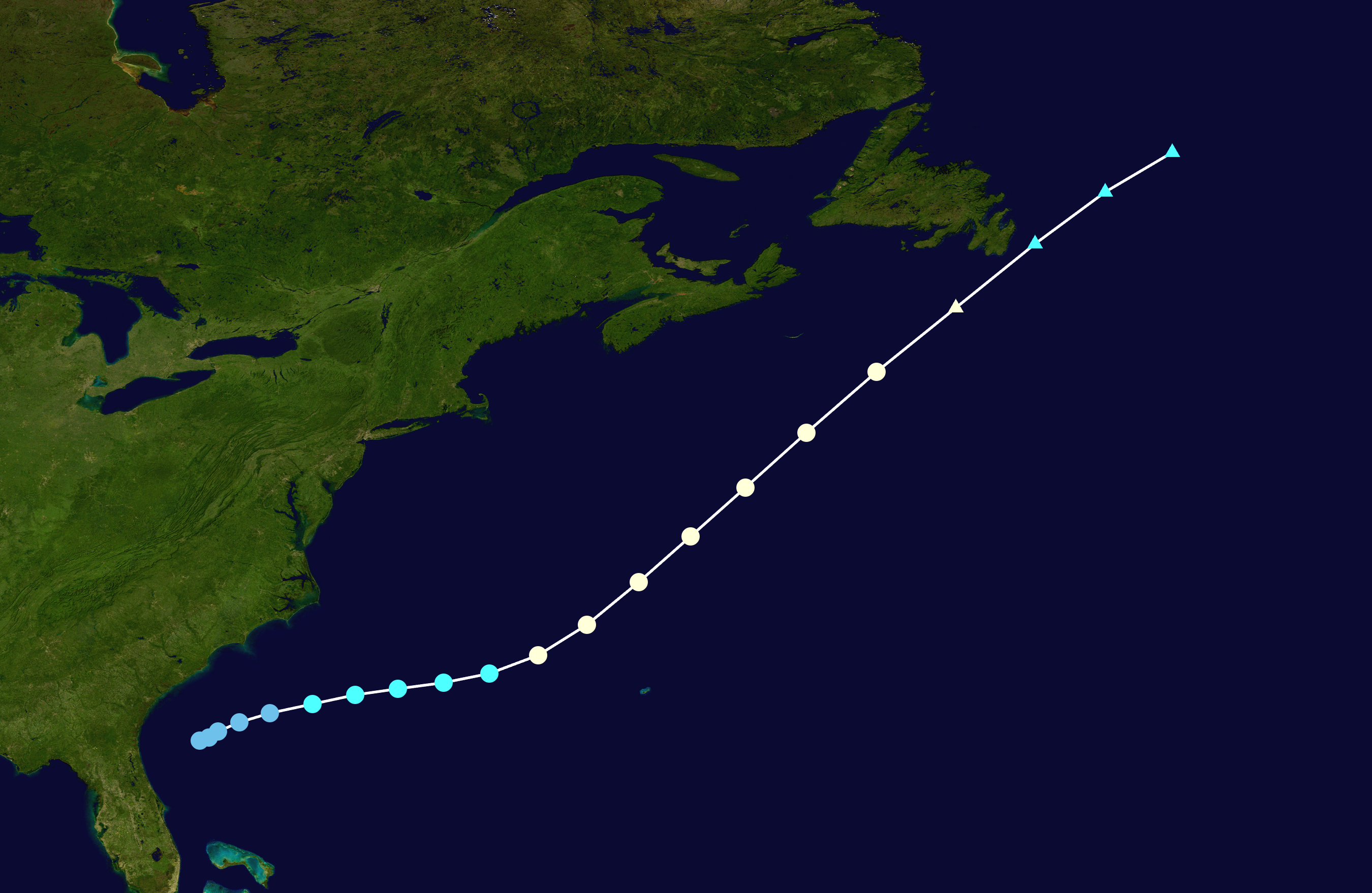
- Duration: July 12 – July 16
- Peak intensity: 90 mph (150 km/h) (1-min); 980 mbar (hPa)

On July 10, a weak area of low pressure formed along a stationary front off the eastern coast of Florida. The disturbance gradually shed this frontal boundary and acquired a well-defined center, leading to the formation of a tropical depression around 00:00 UTC on July 12 to the east of the Florida–Georgia border. It intensified into a tropical storm a little over a day later and further to a Category 1 hurricane early on July 14 as it tracked east-northeast. Based on extrapolation from nearby ship reports, the hurricane is analyzed to have reached peak winds of 90 mph (140 km/h) early on July 15. It transitioned into an extratropical cyclone around 06:00 UTC the next day to the south of Newfoundland.

=== Hurricane Three ===
- Category 1 hurricane (SSHWS)
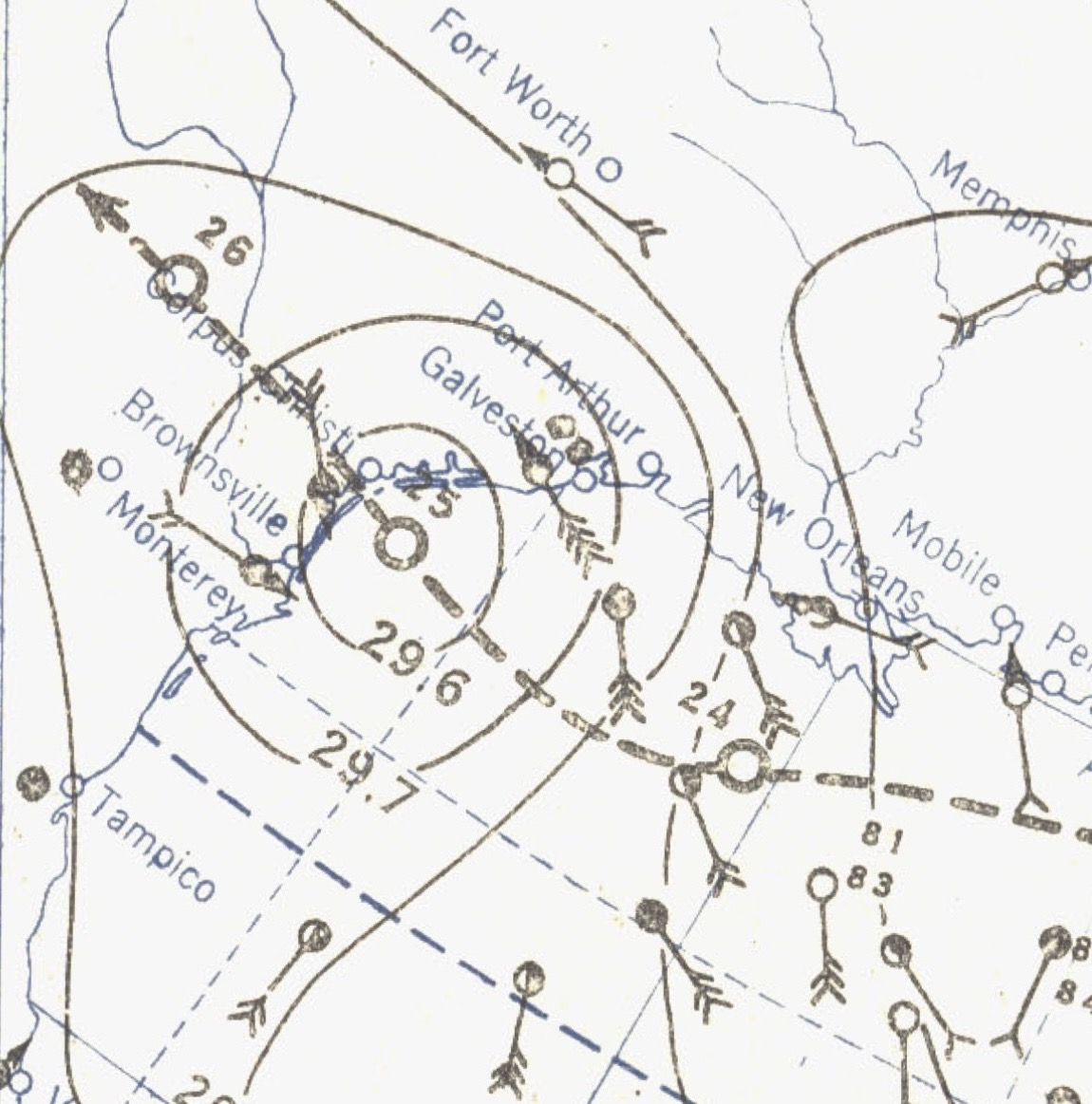
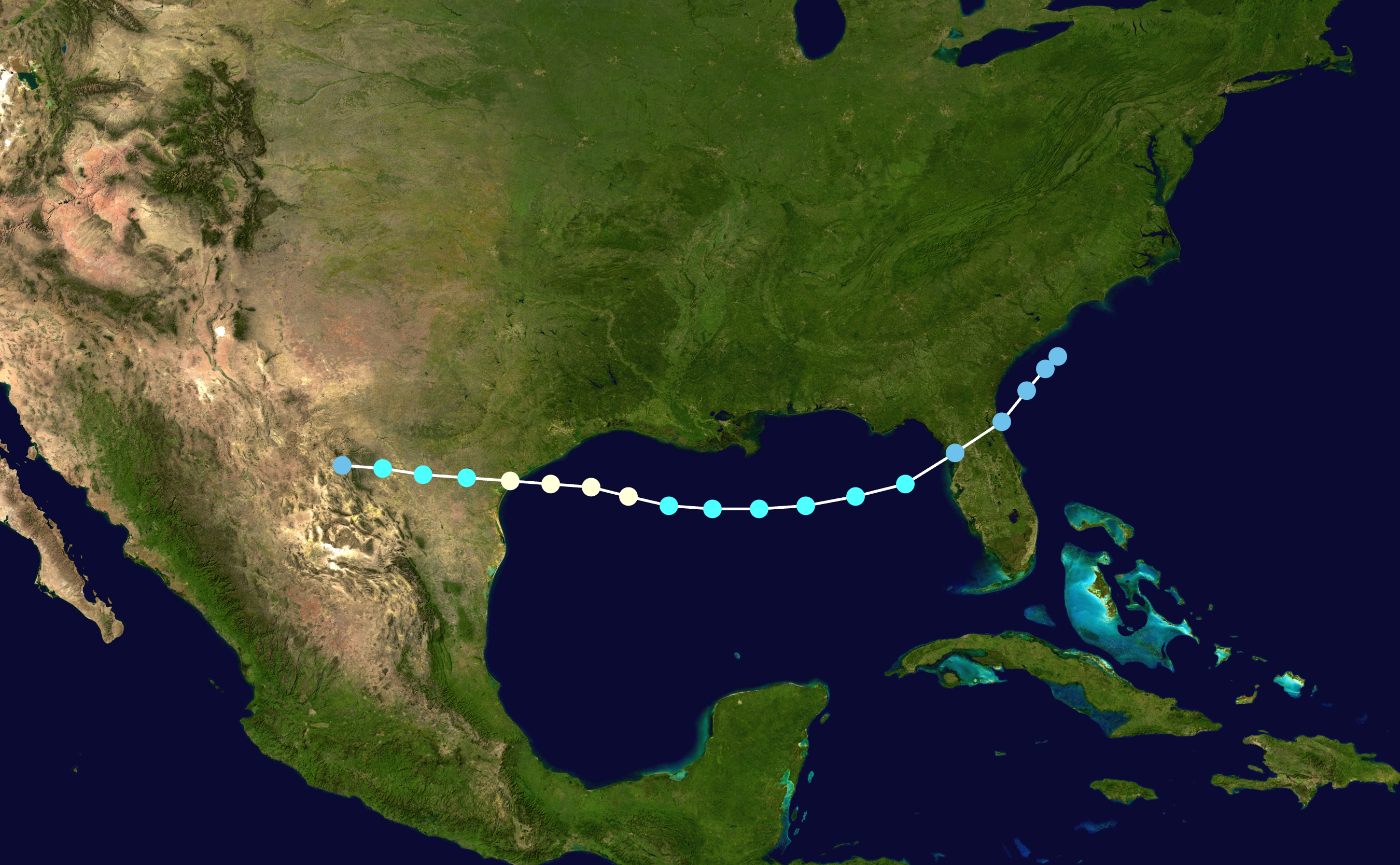
- Duration: July 22 – July 26
- Peak intensity: 85 mph (140 km/h) (1-min); 975 mbar (hPa)

On July 21, a dissipating stationary front was analyzed offshore the Southeast United States. A tropical depression formed a short distance southeast of Charleston, South Carolina, around 06:00 UTC on July 22 and tracked southwest. It made landfall around St. Augustine, Florida, at 00:00 UTC on July 23 without having attained tropical storm strength. After crossing over Florida and into the Gulf of Mexico, the system turned west and began to intensify. It became a tropical storm early that day and further developed into a Category 1 hurricane early on July 25. The cyclone struck the coastline just north of Corpus Christi, Texas, around 17:00 UTC with 80 mph (130 km/h) winds. It continued inland across southern Texas and into northern Mexico and was last analyzed west of Piedras Negras, Coahuila, at 18:00 UTC on July 26.

Minor impacts were recorded in Florida, where trees were toppled, pecans and pears were blown down, and corn crops were flattened. Along the coastline of Texas, high tides damaged waterfront homes in Nueces and Jefferson counties. San José Island observed a 10.2 ft (3.1 m) storm surge. More than 1,000 residents on the Bolivar Peninsula were cut off for 48 hours, and communications between more than a dozen towns were severed. Numerous levee breaches inundated areas around Freeport and Vealsco, where water levels rose to several feet accordingly. Daily rainfall records were set in Fowlerton and Falfurrias at 6.25 and 4.52 in (159 and 115 mm), respectively. Crops suffered extensive damage through several coastal counties, particularly in Nueces County where the local cotton crop suffered a 75 percent loss; several other counties reported a 50 percent loss. Peak winds of 56 mph (90 km/h) were measured in Corpus Christi. Strong winds smashed small boats and tore the roofs off structures, principally in Victoria. Three oil derricks were toppled to the south of the city. A series of tornadoes occurred in communities throughout central Texas. Across the state, preliminary estimates included the destruction of 260 homes, with severe damage to an additional 400 houses. This reportedly encompassed all homes along the mouth of the San Bernard River, all structures between Freeport and the mouth of the Colorado River, and at least 75 percent of homes in Matagorda. Damage was estimated around $4.5 million. Throughout the state, 19 people were killed, most from the large storm surge. Cattle losses were estimated to be in the thousands, with five to six hundred on the western end of Galveston Island alone. In the wake of the storm, federal aid was requested for 22 counties, encompassing a total of 272 families. Poor weather conditions hindered oil and gas prospecting across Starr and Hidalgo counties.

=== Tropical Storm Four ===
- Tropical storm (SSHWS)
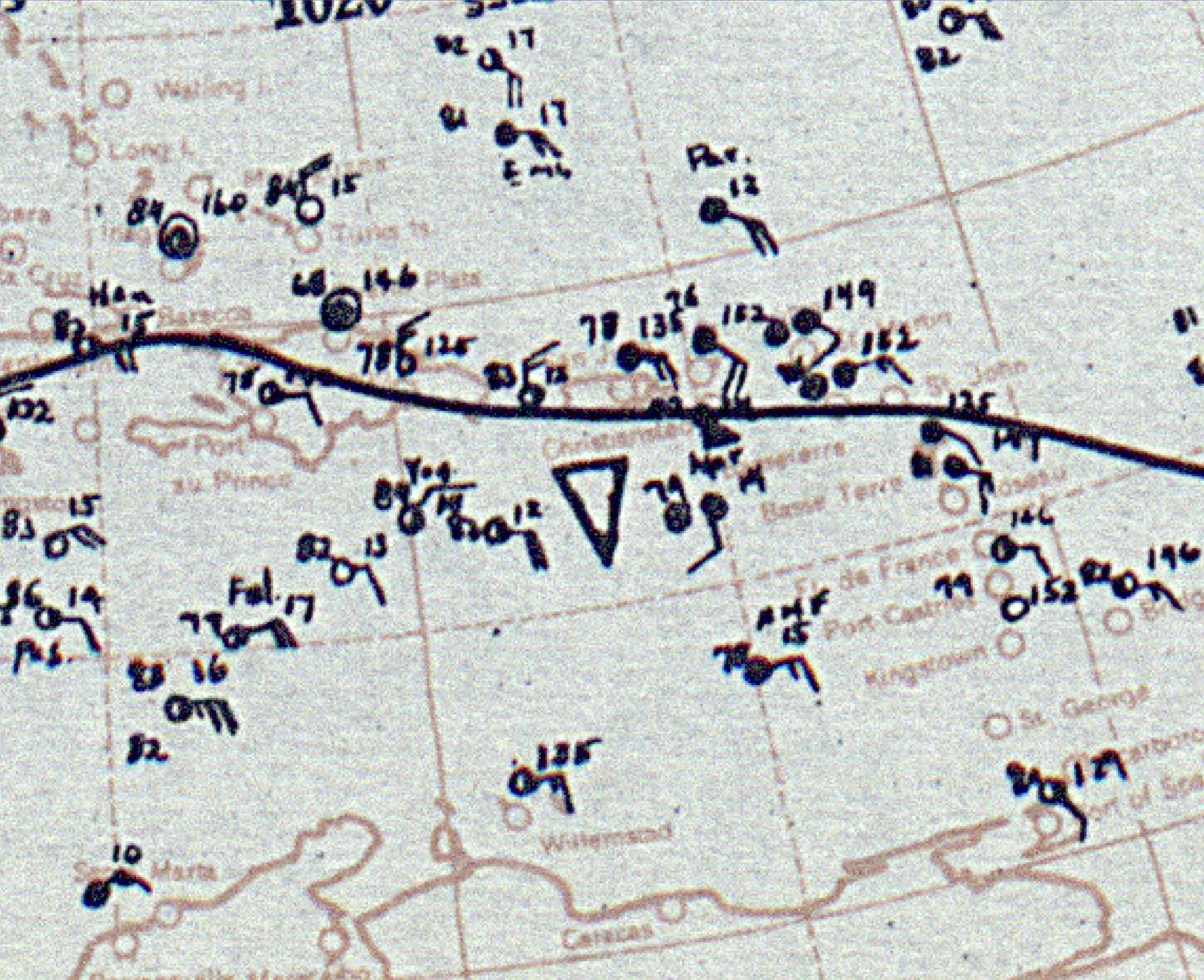
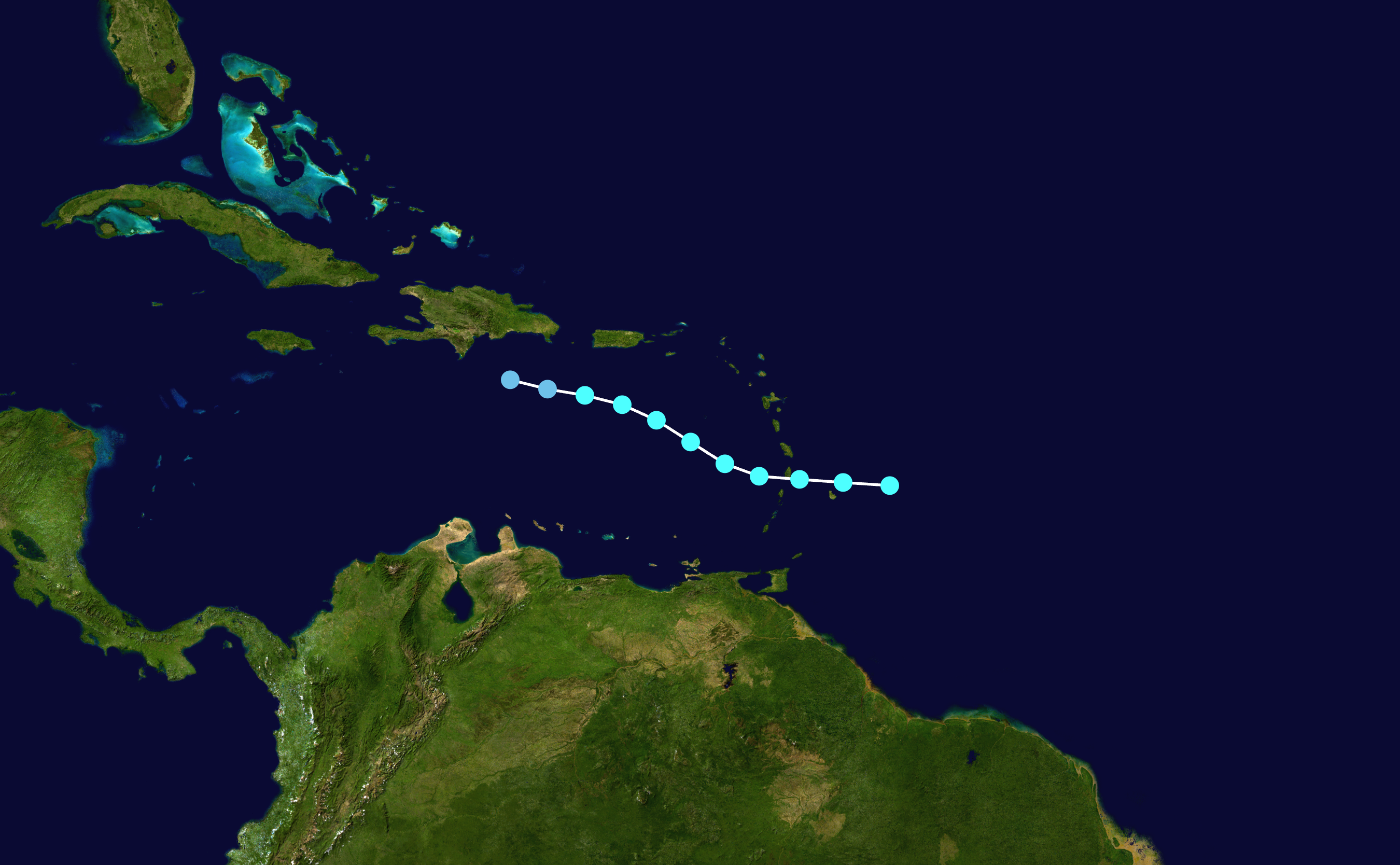
- Duration: August 20 – August 23
- Peak intensity: 40 mph (65 km/h) (1-min);

A weak tropical storm, first documented east of Barbados at 18:00 UTC on August 20, moved west-northwest and entered the Caribbean Sea south of St. Lucia. It failed to intensify over the next few days and instead degenerated to a tropical wave south of the Dominican Republic after 06:00 UTC on August 23. Historical weather maps indicate an area of disturbed weather but no concrete evidence of a well-defined, closed center of circulation. Given the lack of surface observations, meteorologists expressed uncertainty whether the system was actually a tropical cyclone. Some islands of the Lesser Antilles recorded gusty winds, abnormally low atmospheric pressures, and rainfall, including totals exceeding 3.9 in (100 mm) on Martinique.

=== Hurricane Five ===
- Category 1 hurricane (SSHWS)
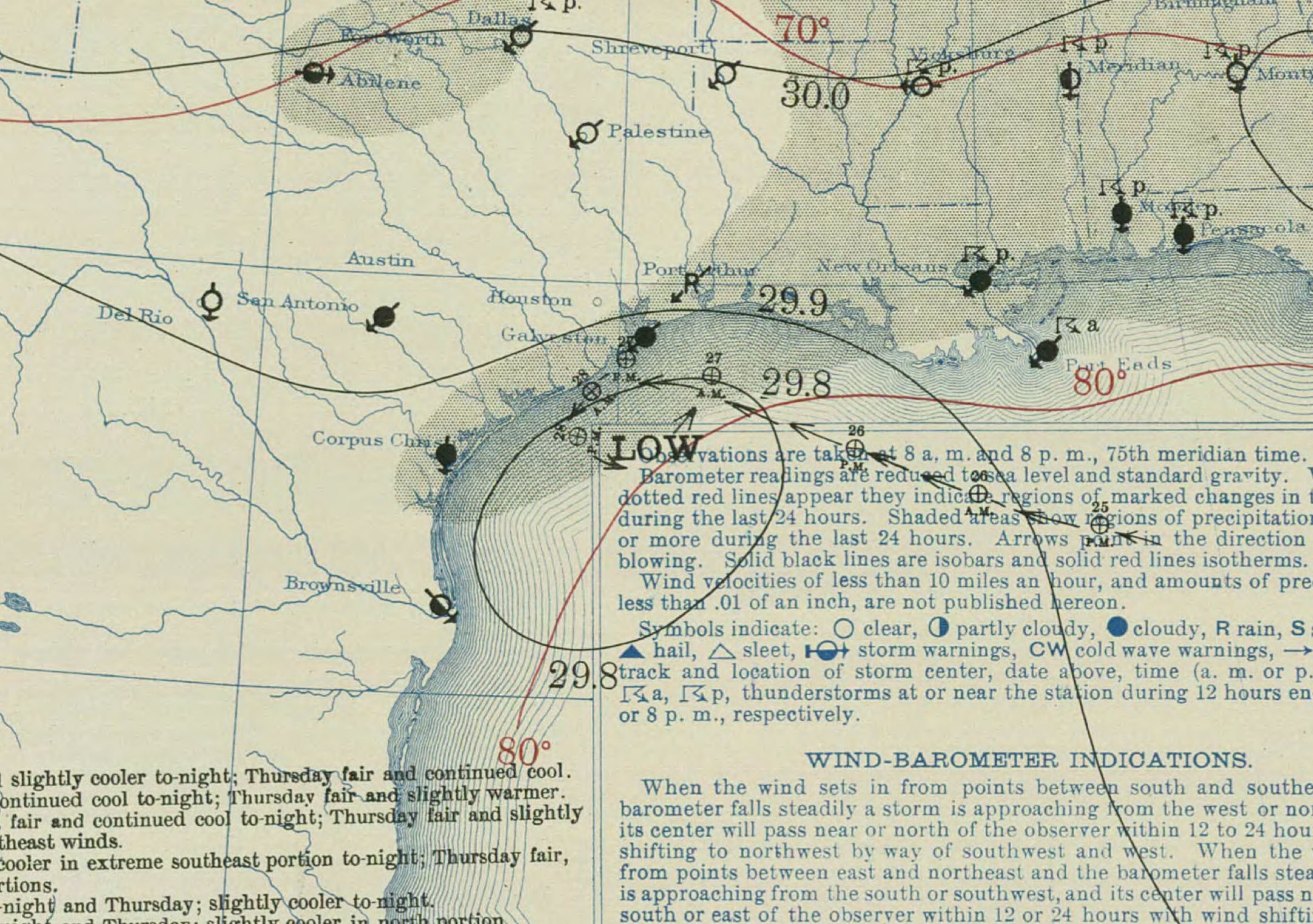
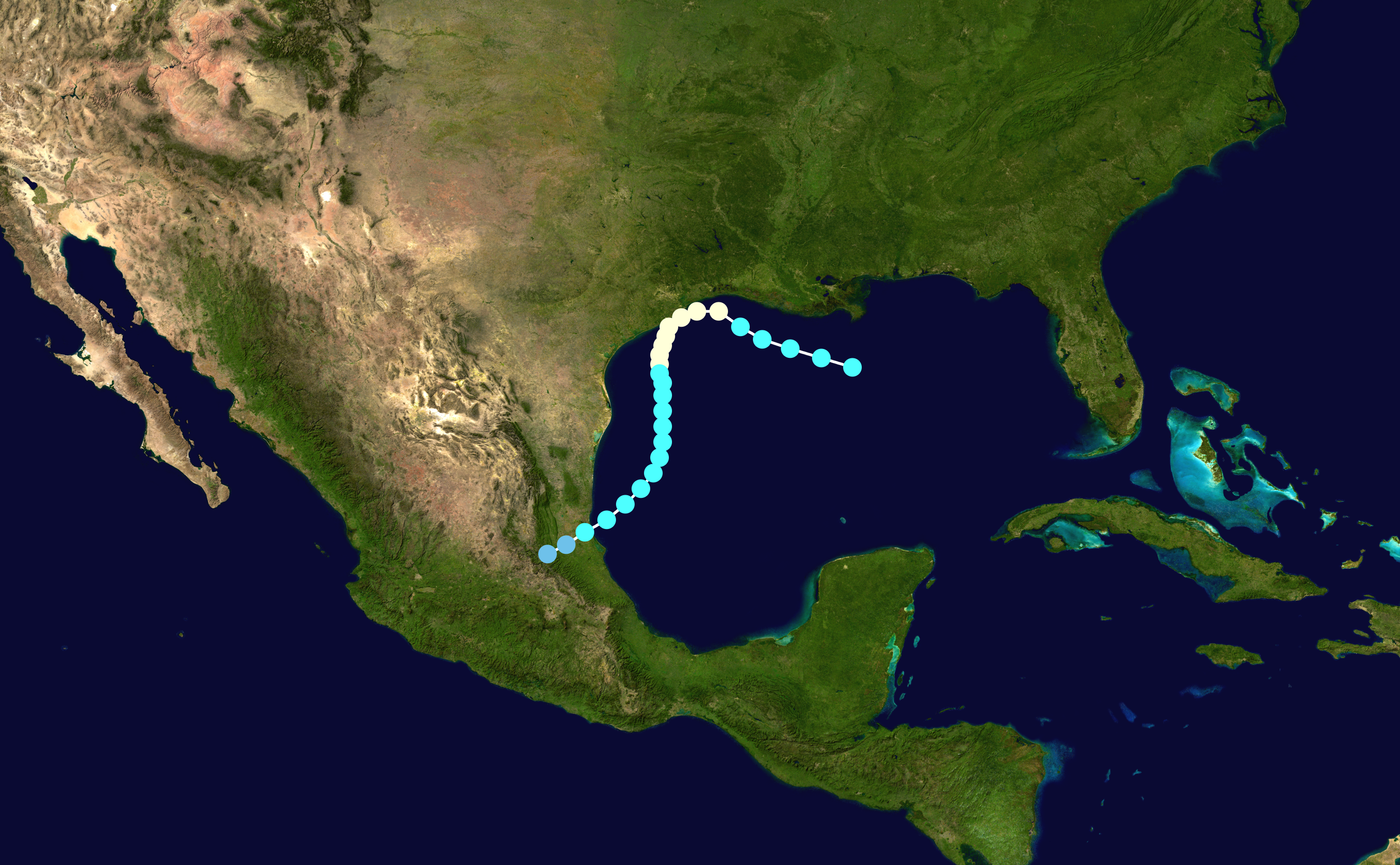
- Duration: August 26 – September 1
- Peak intensity: 80 mph (130 km/h) (1-min); 989 mbar (hPa)

A tropical storm formed in the central Gulf of Mexico around 06:00 UTC on August 26 from a stationary front or perhaps the remnants of the previous tropical cyclone. It initially moved west-northwest off the coast of Louisiana but soon banked toward the south, passing within 25 mi (40 km) of Galveston, Texas, as it intensified into a Category 1 hurricane with winds of 80 mph (130 km/h). The slow-moving system weakened as it moved into the Bay of Campeche. It curved southwest and made landfall near Tampico, Tamaulipas, with winds of 45 mph (72 km/h) around 04:00 UTC on September 1 and dissipated after 18:00 UTC that day.

In advance of the storm, the American Red Cross was deployed to give aid if needed. Tropical storm-force winds affected the Texas coastline from Port Arthur down to Matagorda Bay; peak winds of 60 mph (97 km/h) likely impacted areas between Freeport and Galveston as the storm made its closest approach. A daily rainfall record during the month of August was set in Garden City, at 6.25 in (159 mm). Tides up to 8.2 ft (2.5 m) affected the coastline around Sabine. At the final landfall point, the tropical storm destroyed houses in the community of Soto la Marina, Tamaulipas.

=== Tropical Storm Six ===
- Tropical storm (SSHWS)
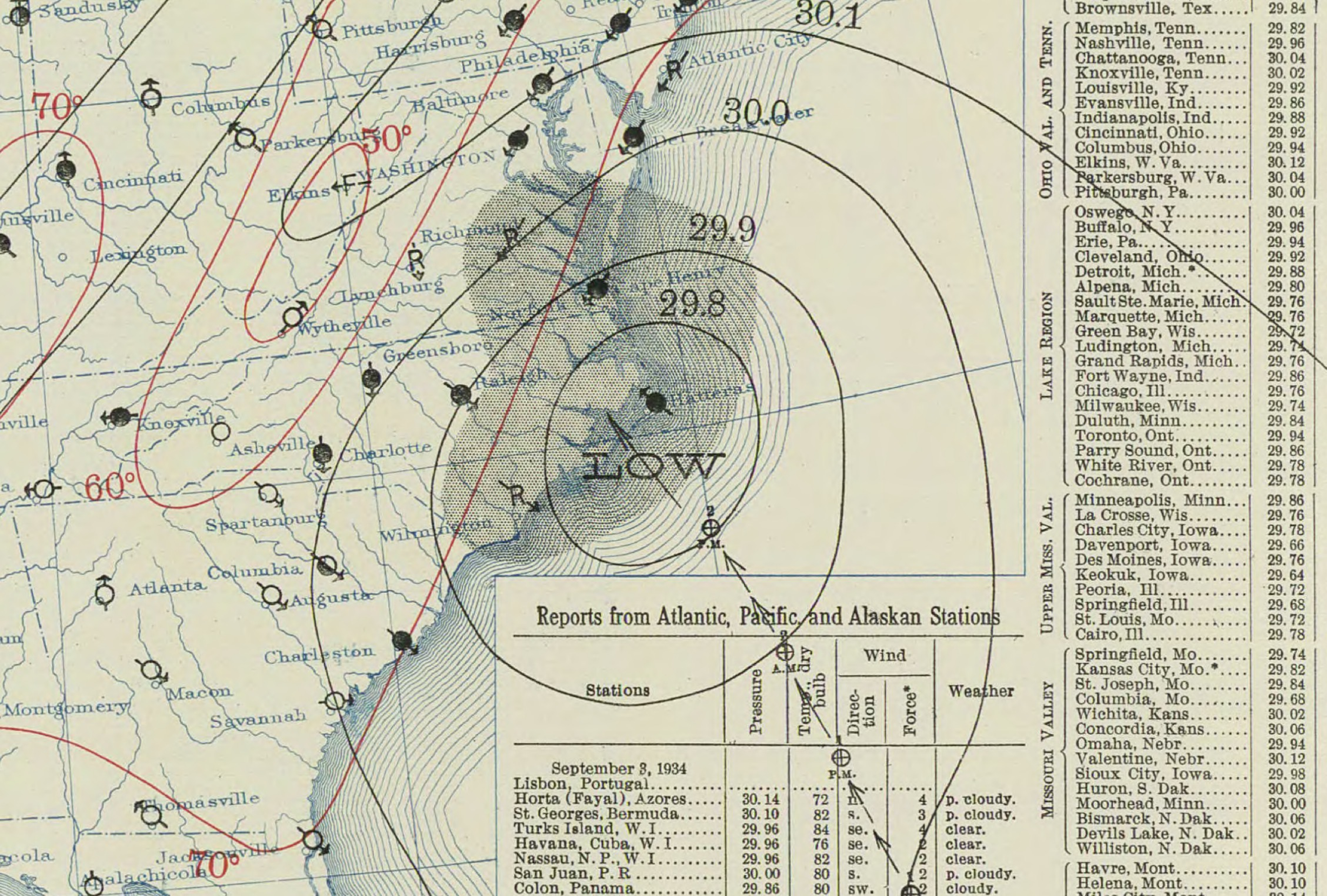
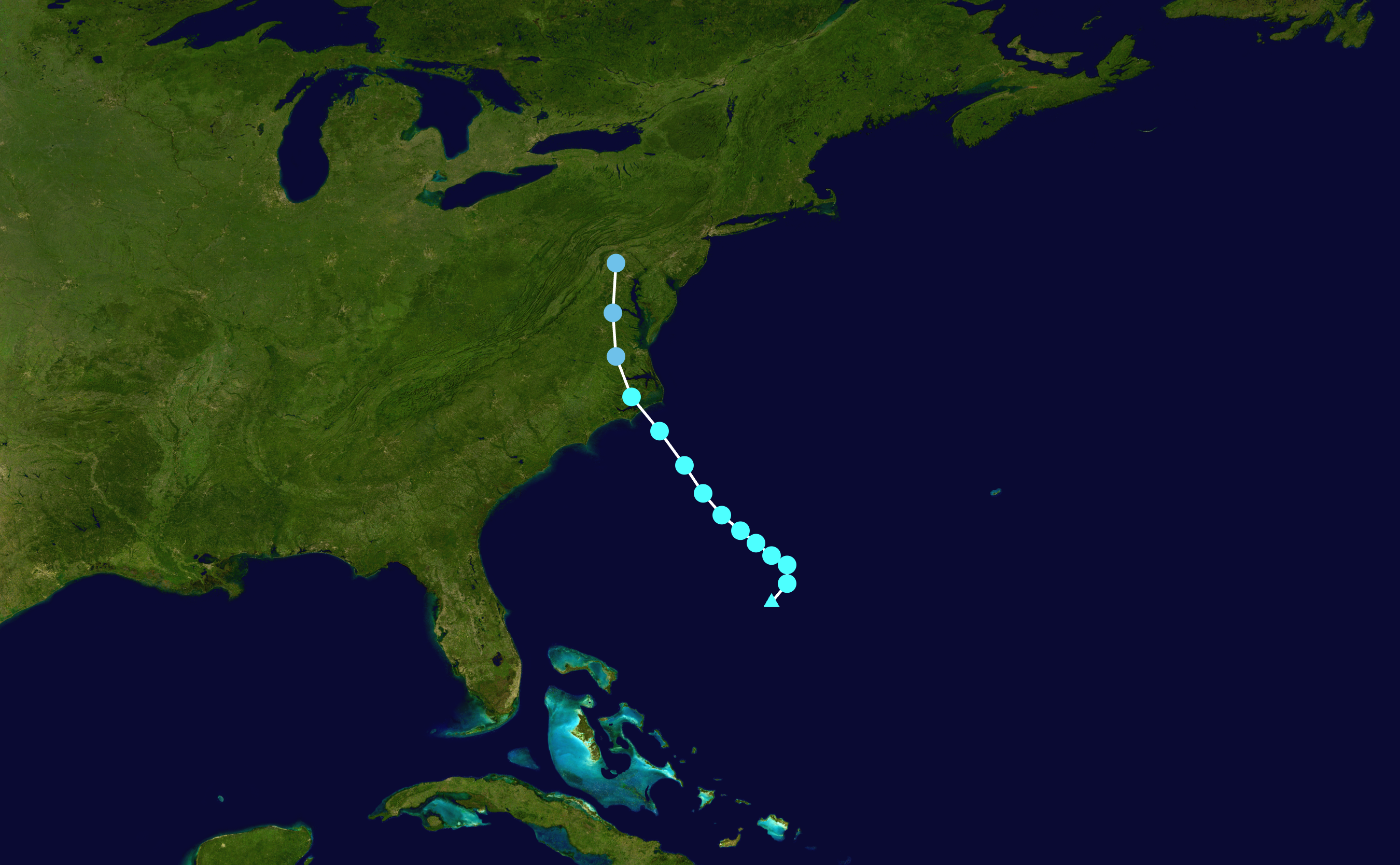
- Duration: September 1 – September 4
- Peak intensity: 50 mph (85 km/h) (1-min); 1008 mbar (hPa)

In 2012, as part of the National Hurricane Center's reanalysis project, a new tropical cyclone was retroactively added to the season. A stationary front sagged across the western Atlantic in the final days of August. On September 1, an extratropical low developed as the front began to dissipate, and it quickly transitioned into a tropical storm by 06:00 UTC while south and west of Bermuda. The system moved northwest and reached peak winds of 50 mph (80 km/h). Slight weakening ensued before it made landfall on the North Carolina Outer Banks at 10:00 UTC on September 3. The cyclone continued to decay as it moved across Virginia and Maryland, and it was absorbed by a front northwest of Baltimore after 06:00 UTC the next morning.

In Virginia, the storm halted the annual James River regatta and three craft were capsized by gusty winds. Owing to heavy rainfall and tides up to 8 ft (2.4 m), several streams were swollen; floodwaters washed away bridges and rendered several routes impassable.

=== Hurricane Seven ===
- Category 2 hurricane (SSHWS)
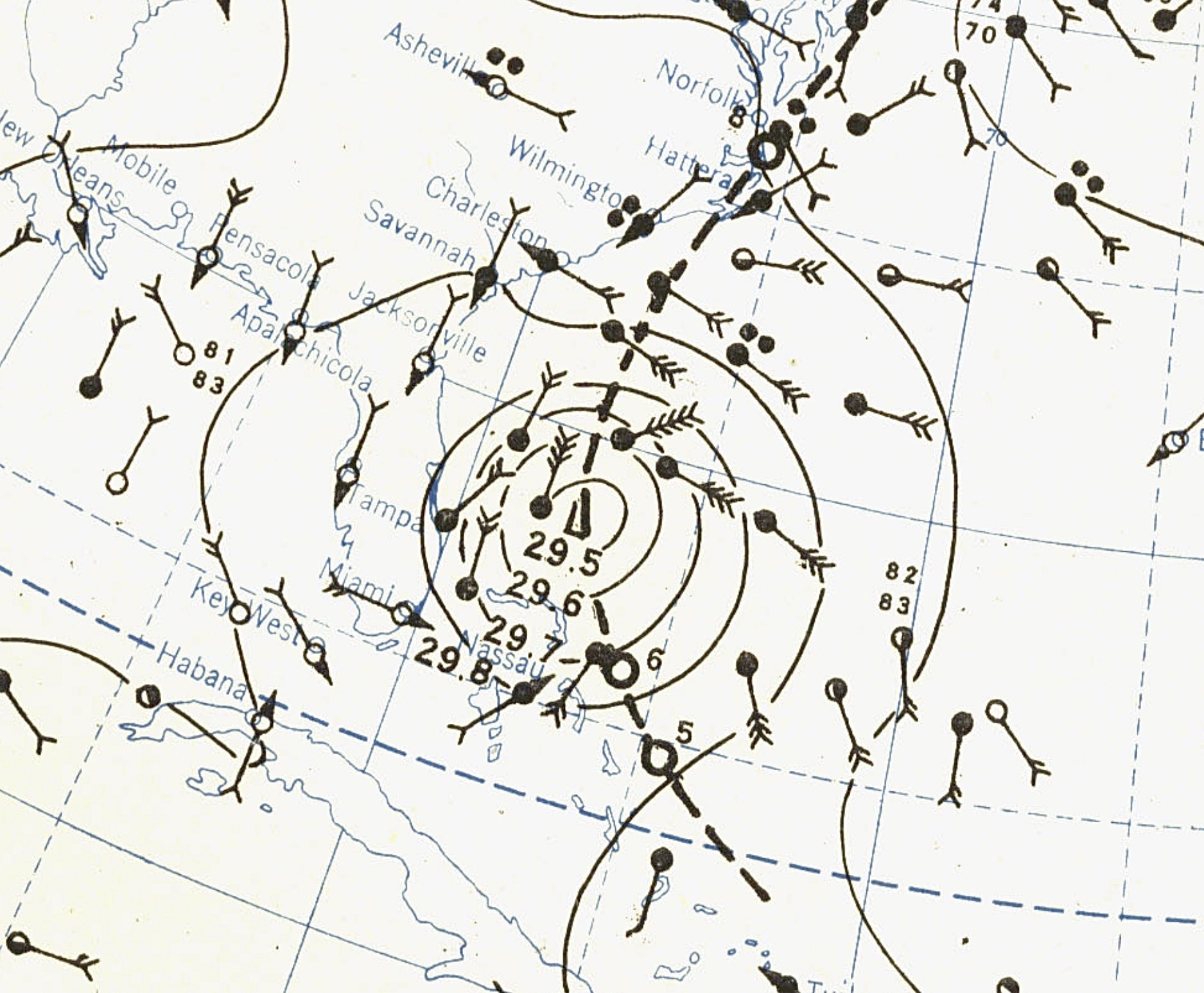
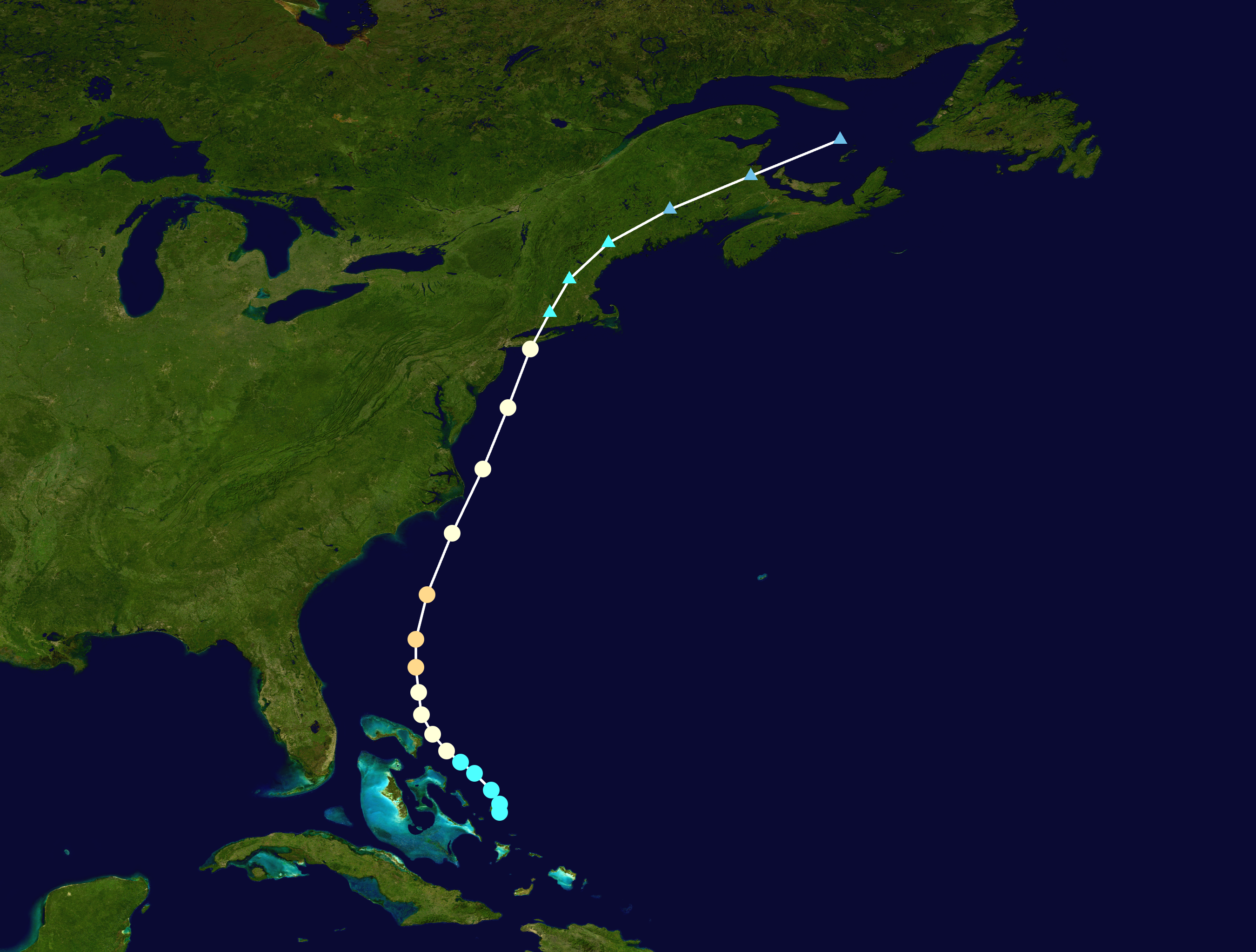
- Duration: September 5 – September 9
- Peak intensity: 105 mph (165 km/h) (1-min); 967 mbar (hPa)

Although its origins are not conclusively known, a tropical storm is believed to have developed near the Bahamas around 06:00 UTC on September 5 from the remnants of a mid-level trough. The cyclone began on a west-northwest trajectory but curved toward the north-northeast over subsequent days. It reached hurricane strength early on September 6 and further intensified to a Category 2 hurricane with winds of 105 mph (169 km/h) late the next day. The storm made close approaches to the coastlines of North Carolina and New Jersey before making later landfalls in New England. The first landfall occurred on Long Island with winds of 75 mph (121 km/h) at 02:00 UTC on September 9, and the second took place near New Haven, Connecticut, with winds of 60 mph (97 km/h) two hours later. The system transitioned into an extratropical cyclone by 06:00 UTC on September 9 and curved northeast before dissipating over the Gulf of Saint Lawrence the following morning.

The center of the hurricane narrowly missed the North Carolina Outer Banks, where winds of 72 mph (116 km) were recorded in Hatteras. Small craft and light-framed buildings suffered damage but impacts were otherwise negligible. Tropical storm-force winds also overspread much of the Mid-Atlantic states and New England, highest at 66 mph (106 km/h) in Atlantic City, New Jersey. The system produced sporadic areas of heavy rainfall along the U.S. East Coast from North Carolina north into Maine. Accumulations peaked at 9.6 in (240 mm) in Beaufort, North Carolina. In Virginia, the combination of strong winds and heavy rain brought down trees and electrical lines. Numerous accidents were recorded in Richmond and surrounding areas due to wet roadways. Some routes were inundated by floodwaters, and one bridge was washed away. Similar effects were felt across Maryland. In Baltimore, rushing water up to 5 ft (1.5 m) in depth stalled vehicles and displaced some nearly a block away. The cellars and first floors of homes were flooded, while underpasses and roads were deemed impassable. In one case near Ensor, a 2 ft (0.61 m) strip of asphalt was pushed upward several inches. Two buildings were electrically charged for unknown reasons during the storm, shocking one person before the structures were roped off. Throughout Annapolis, about 20 telephones were left out of commission, floodwaters entered cabins and restaurants, and trees and debris washed over roadways. Some rivers and streams throughout the western portion of the state overflowed their banks.

In Fair Haven, New Jersey, a 69-year-old man was killed after being electrocuted by a live wire downed by the storm. Along the coastline, the United States Coast Guard attempted search and rescue of the SS Morro Castle which caught fire and killed 137 people on board, but these efforts were limited by low visibility at least partly attributed to the storm. Three crewmen of the schooner Neshaminy died when it capsized off Brigantine. In New York, two seaman drowned and three others were rescued when their tugboat overturned in New York Bay. Further still, a man died after his sailboat overturned in rough seas near Northport, Long Island. Ten people on a fishing expedition were rescued on Long Beach after their attempt to anchor at sea failed. A short distance away in Hempstead Harbor, an inn was washed from its piles and demolished. At the Suffolk County Fairgrounds, an automobile building saw a large section of its sheet metal roof torn off. A number of exhibition tents were blown down. In Patchogue, a garage was flattened and several small signs were torn loose and damaged. Trees and power poles were toppled across the region, disrupting travel, causing damage to structures, and cutting power to entire communities such as Mattituck and Glen Cove. Throughout communities such as Hempstead Harbor, Sea Cliff, Peconic Bay, and Greenport, scores of boats or scows were ripped from their moorings, heavily damaged, displaced, or left in ruin; in Peconic Bay specifically, damage to nearly 50 boats amounted to $10,000. Docks likewise suffered substantial damage. A 15 ft (4.6 m) section of a cornice on the roof of a four-story warehouse was brought to the ground by the storm's winds. A 15 ft (4.6 m) stretch of the Port Washington Branch, part of the Long Island Rail Road, was disrupted by a washout. In Great Neck, a train track was carried out of line by rushing water. Lightning twice struck the Huntington Station, causing two fires that were quickly extinguished. In the city of Huntington, more than 100 telephones were put out of commission. In Queens, hundreds of sewers filled to capacity or overflowed, but the heavy rainfall was also seen as beneficial to local crops. Four buildings, including a school, were struck by lightning; one home was partially destroyed. A narrow waterspout ripped through the northern part of the borough but caused no known damage. In the eastern section of the borough, a man died after crashing his vehicle in the downpours. James Roosevelt, son of President Franklin Roosevelt, was the subject of an eleven-vessel search as he sailed through the storm off Maine; his schooner made it to Portland safely. On Lake Ontario, a Canadian National Railway car ferry was unexpectedly hit by a large wave, severely damaging the ship and injuring 52 people.

=== Tropical Storm Eight ===
- Tropical storm (SSHWS)
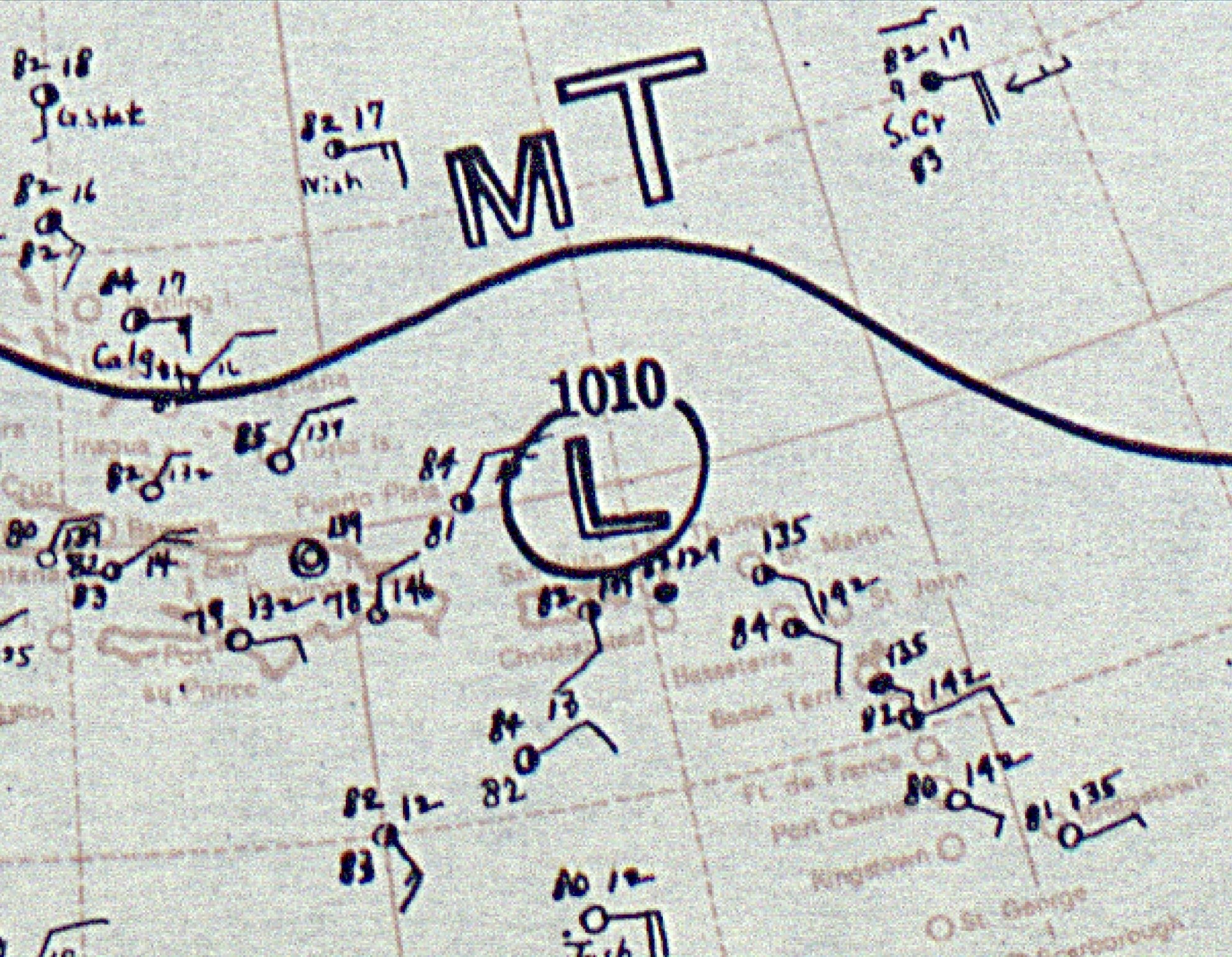
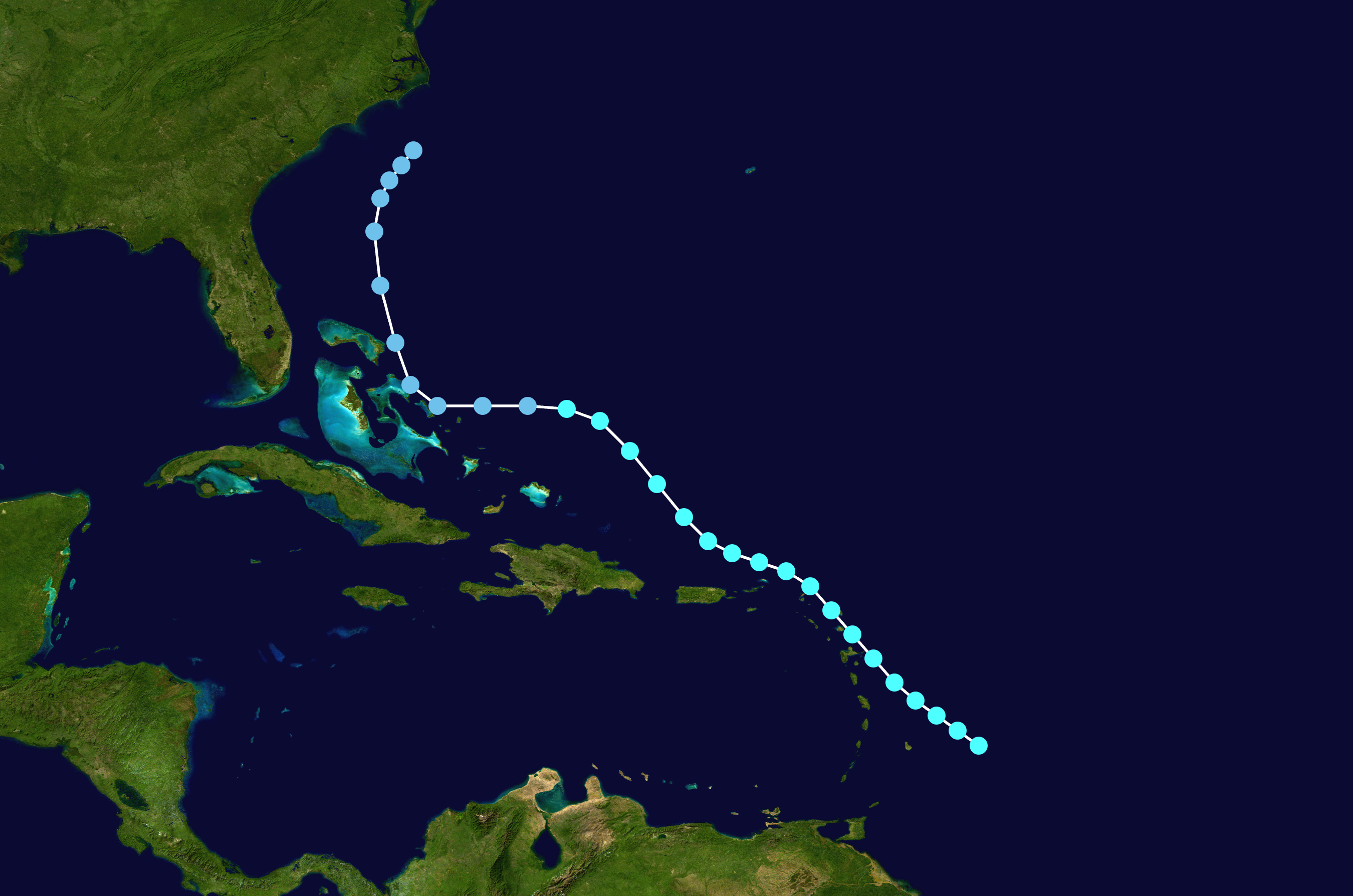
- Duration: September 16 – September 23
- Peak intensity: 50 mph (85 km/h) (1-min); 1010 mbar (hPa)

A tropical storm was first documented east of Barbados around 12:00 UTC on September 16. It alternated between a west-northwest and west motion for several days, narrowly missing the Leeward Islands and gradually strengthening to a peak intensity of 50 mph (80 km/h). The system weakened to a tropical depression on September 21 and passed near the northern Bahamas before turning north and north-northeast. It dissipated after 12:00 UTC on September 23 off southeastern North Carolina while interacting with an approaching front. The Lesser Antilles mainly recorded rainfall due to the storm, with Martinique observing up to 1.5 in (38 mm) at Ducos.

=== Tropical Storm Nine ===
- Tropical storm (SSHWS)
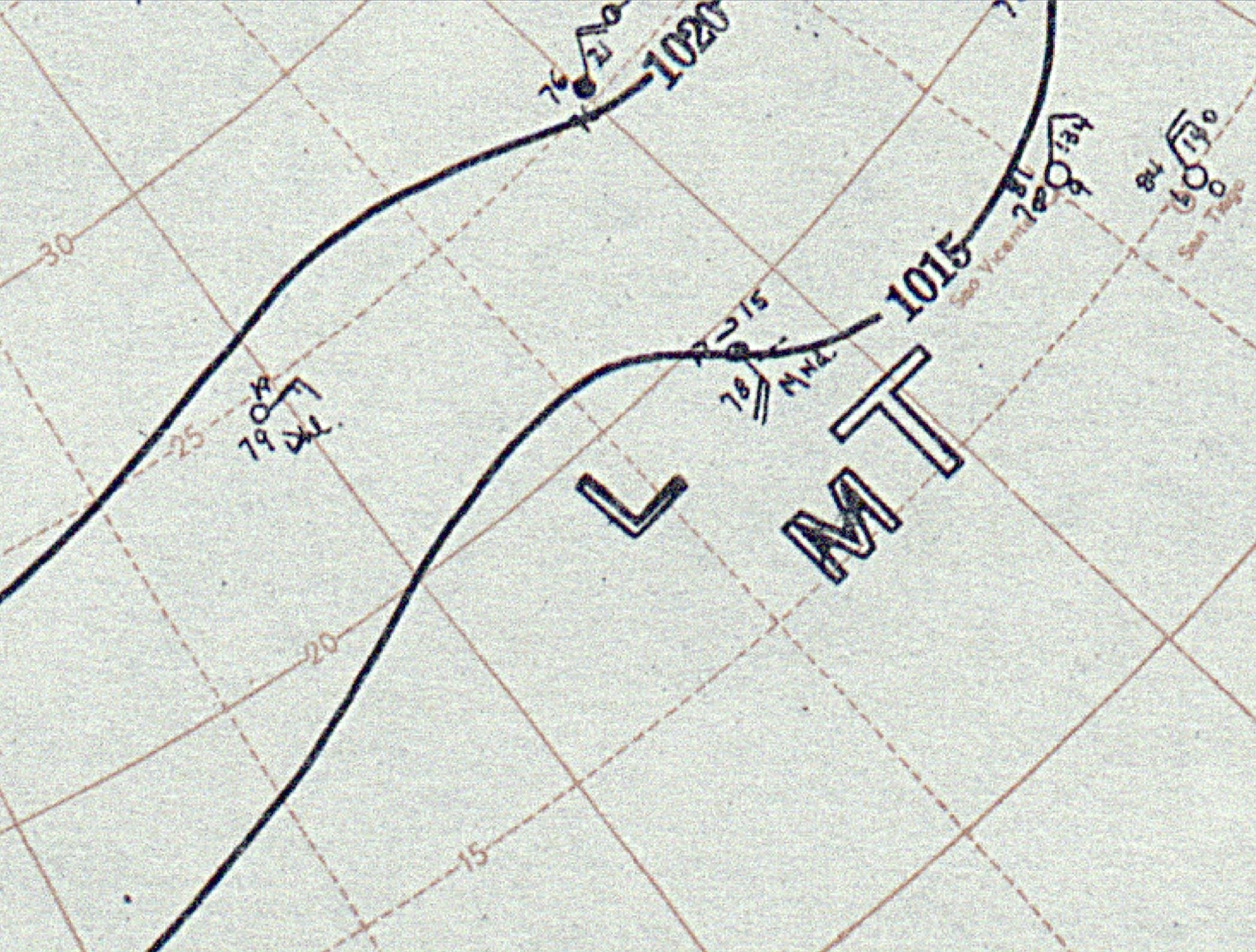
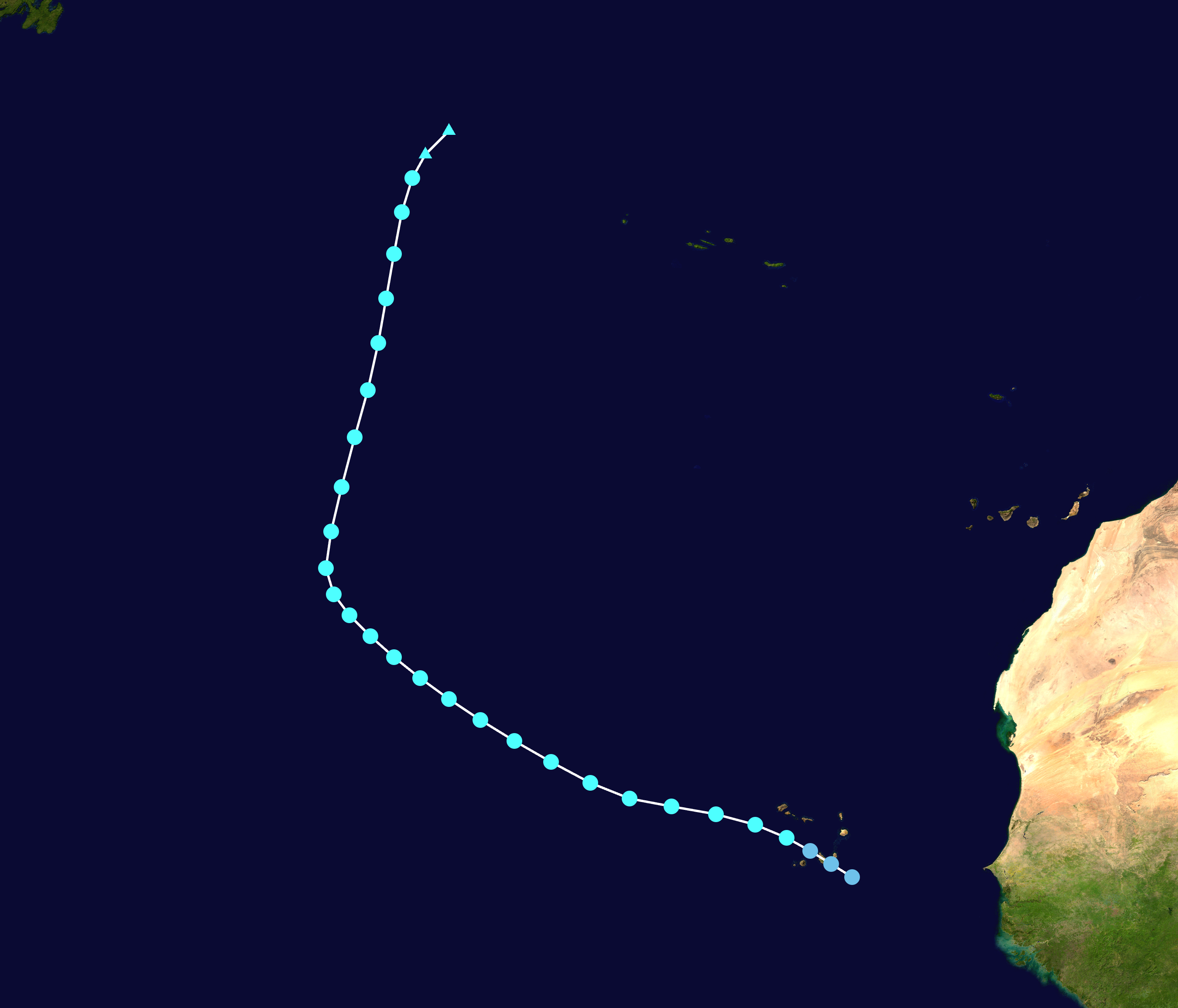
- Duration: September 18 – September 24
- Peak intensity: 60 mph (95 km/h) (1-min); 1000 mbar (hPa)

Another tropical cyclone discovered during reanalysis was found to have developed southeast of Cabo Verde around 00:00 UTC on September 18. It intensified into a tropical storm eighteen hours later while moving west-northwest through the islands. The cyclone maintained that motion for several days before turning north into the northeastern Atlantic. It reached peak winds of 60 mph (97 km/h) early on September 24 but transitioned into an extratropical cyclone around 00:00 UTC the next day. The post-tropical system merged with another low or dissipated after 06:00 UTC on September 25 to the northwest of the Azores.

=== Hurricane Ten ===
- Category 2 hurricane (SSHWS)
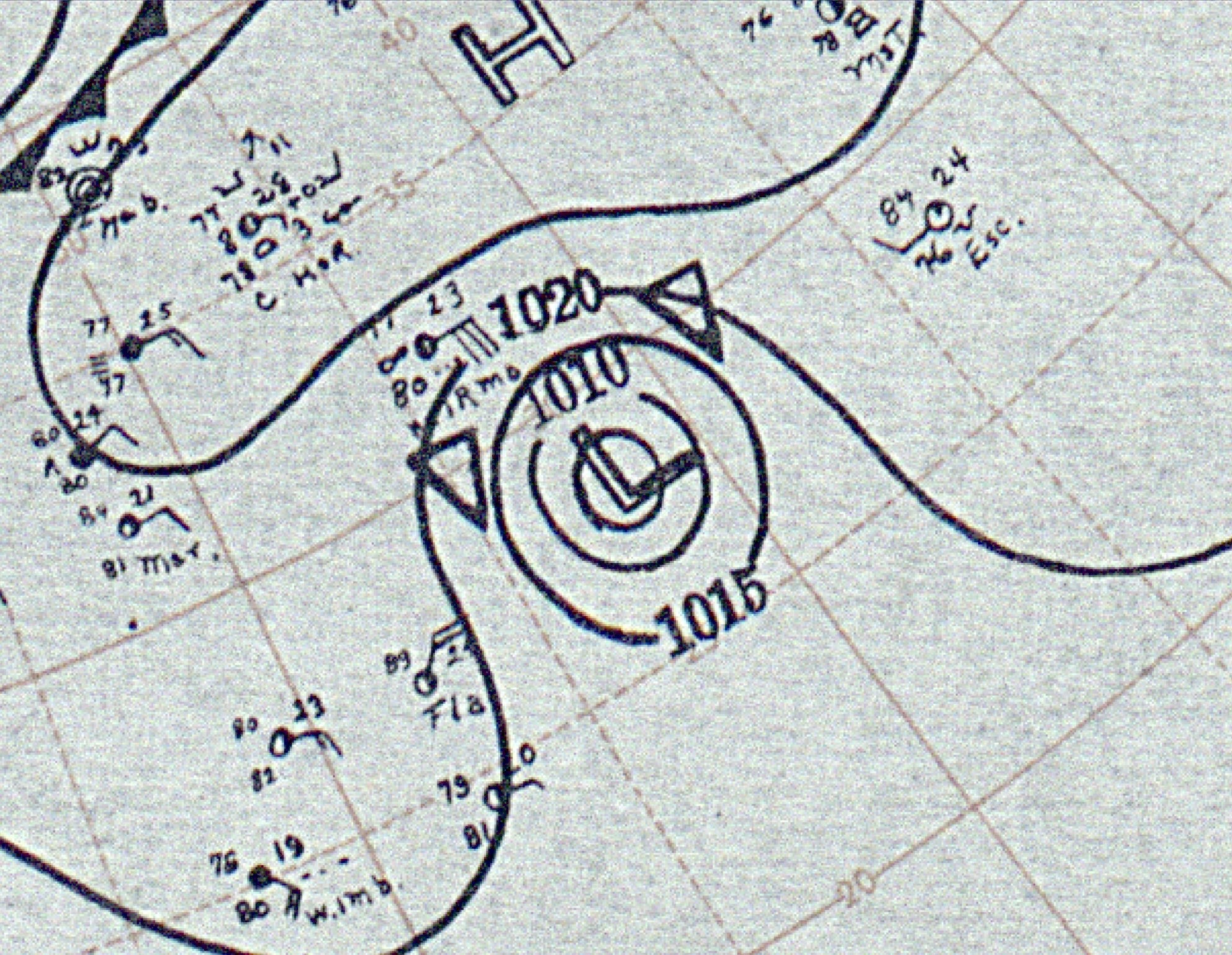
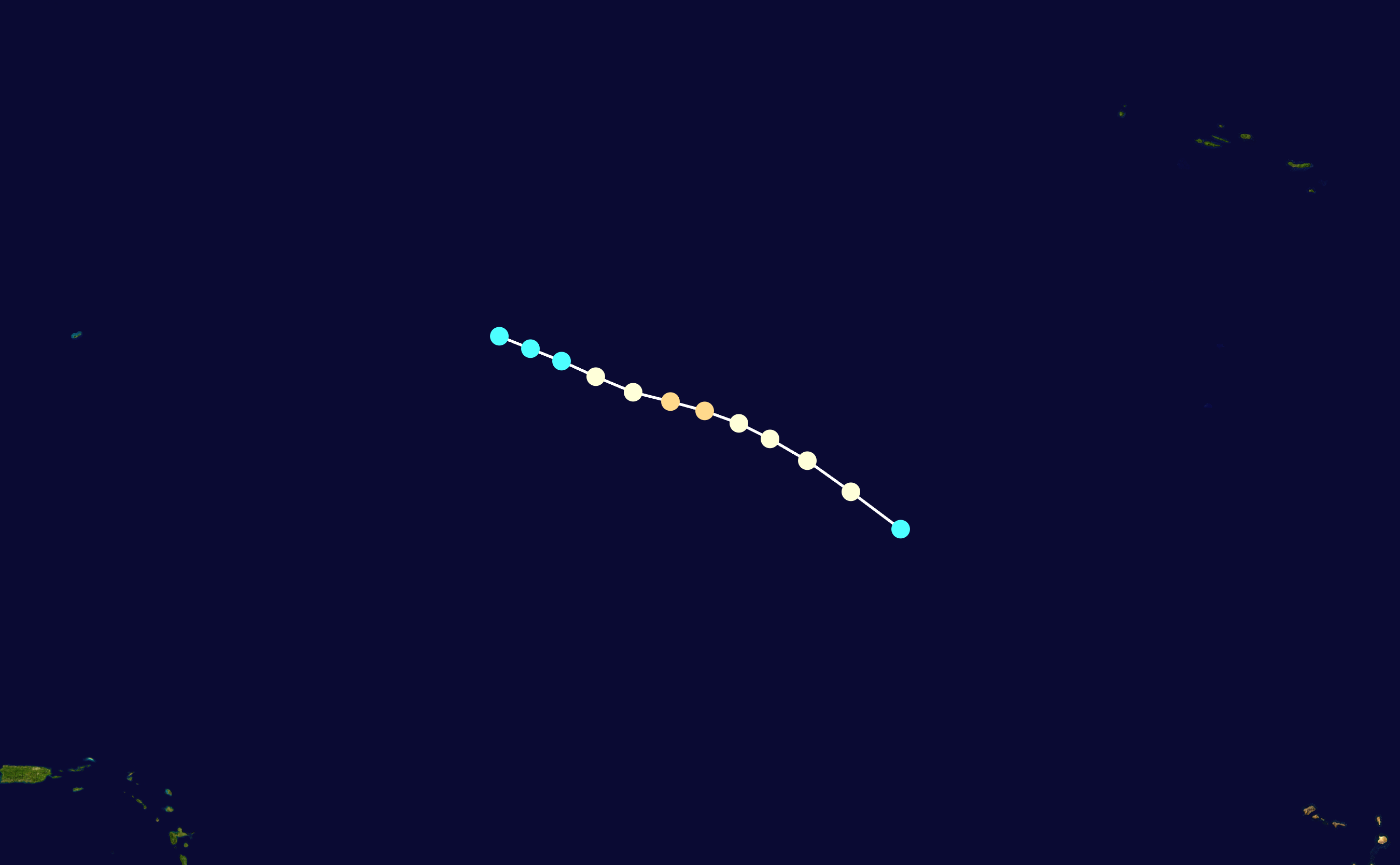
- Duration: October 1 – October 4
- Peak intensity: 100 mph (155 km/h) (1-min); 984 mbar (hPa)

An area of low pressure coalesced into a tropical cyclone prior to 12:00 UTC on October 1, when otherwise scant data points supported the existence of a strong tropical storm. It intensified into a hurricane within six hours and peaked at Category 2 intensity with winds of 100 mph (160 km/h) late on October 2. The system gradually decayed thereafter as it moved west-northwest, dissipating over the open Atlantic after 06:00 UTC on October 4.

=== Tropical Storm Eleven ===
- Tropical storm (SSHWS)
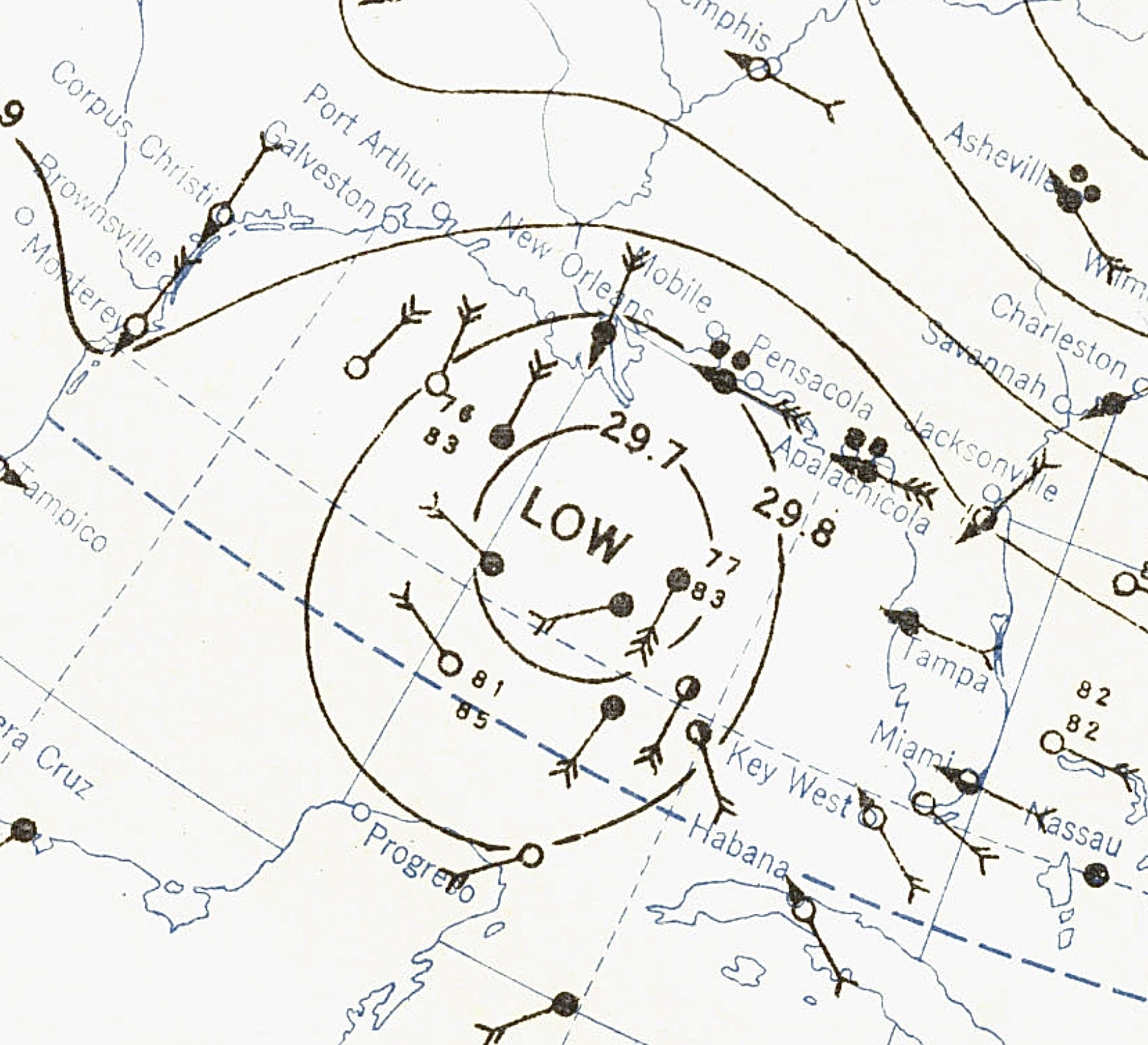
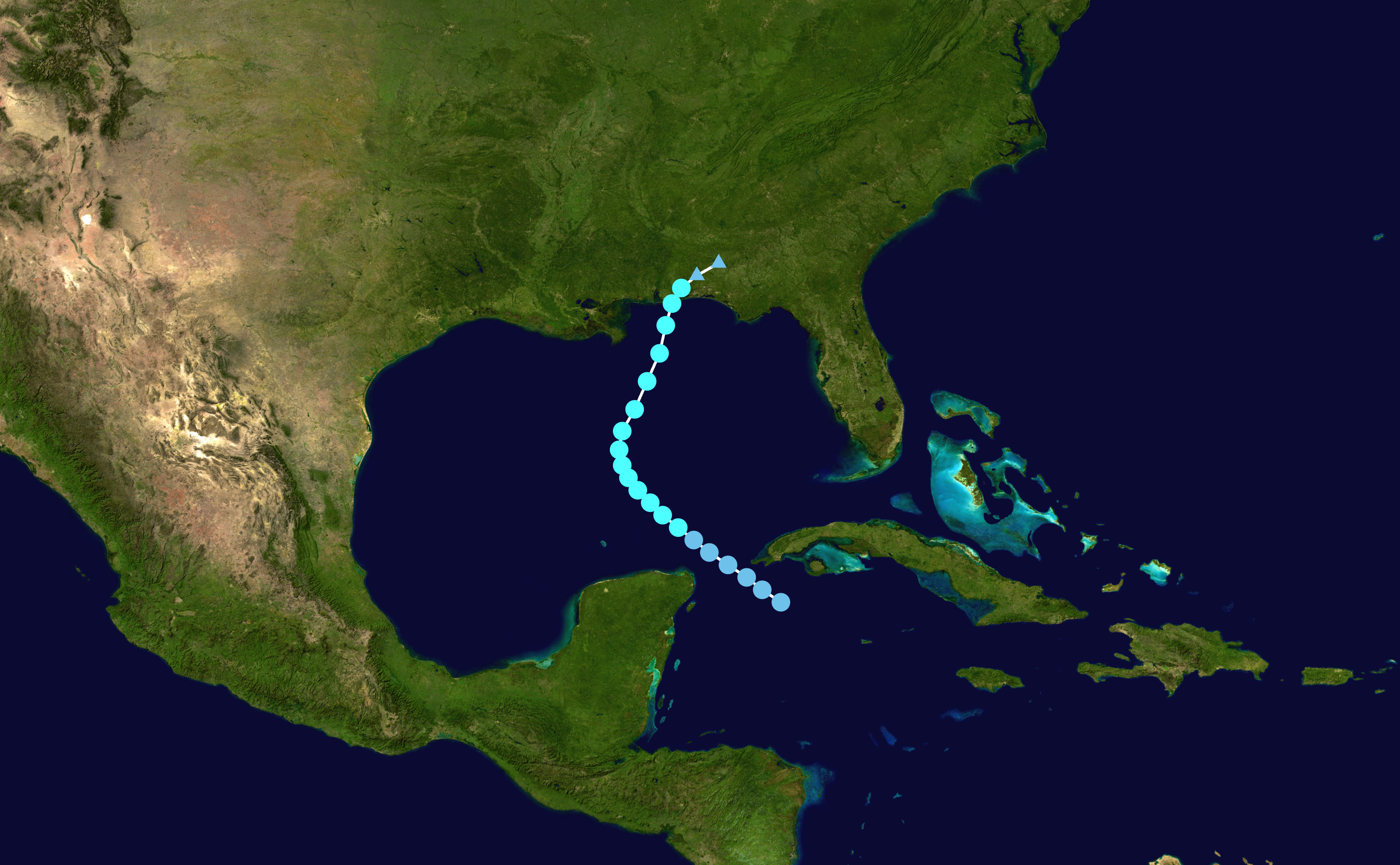
- Duration: October 1 – October 6
- Peak intensity: 60 mph (95 km/h) (1-min); 1004 mbar (hPa)

A tropical depression formed in the northwestern Caribbean Sea around 12:00 UTC on October 1. It progressed northwest through the Yucatán Channel and into the central Gulf of Mexico, where it attained tropical storm intensity early on October 3. The storm peaked with winds of 50 mph (80 km/h) while curving toward the north-northeast. It weakened slightly before making landfall east of the Alabama–Florida border at 01:00 UTC on October 6, and the system transitioned into an extratropical cyclone by 12:00 UTC that morning. The storm was absorbed by a frontal system after 18:00 UTC while over southeastern Alabama.

Several ships reported gale- and storm-force winds off the Gulf coast. Heavy rainfall overspread the Southeast U.S. from Florida to Virginia, peaking at 15.3 in (390 mm) in Pensacola, Florida. Streets were flooded, leaving automobiles stranded. The floodwaters drove some people out of their homes in the low-lying areas of the city. Sustained winds reached 38 mph (61 km/h) in Pensacola. Higher winds of 44 mph (71 km/h) were recorded in New Orleans, Louisiana. Some bridges in Baldwin County, Alabama, were washed out by the rains.

=== Tropical Storm Twelve ===
- Tropical storm (SSHWS)
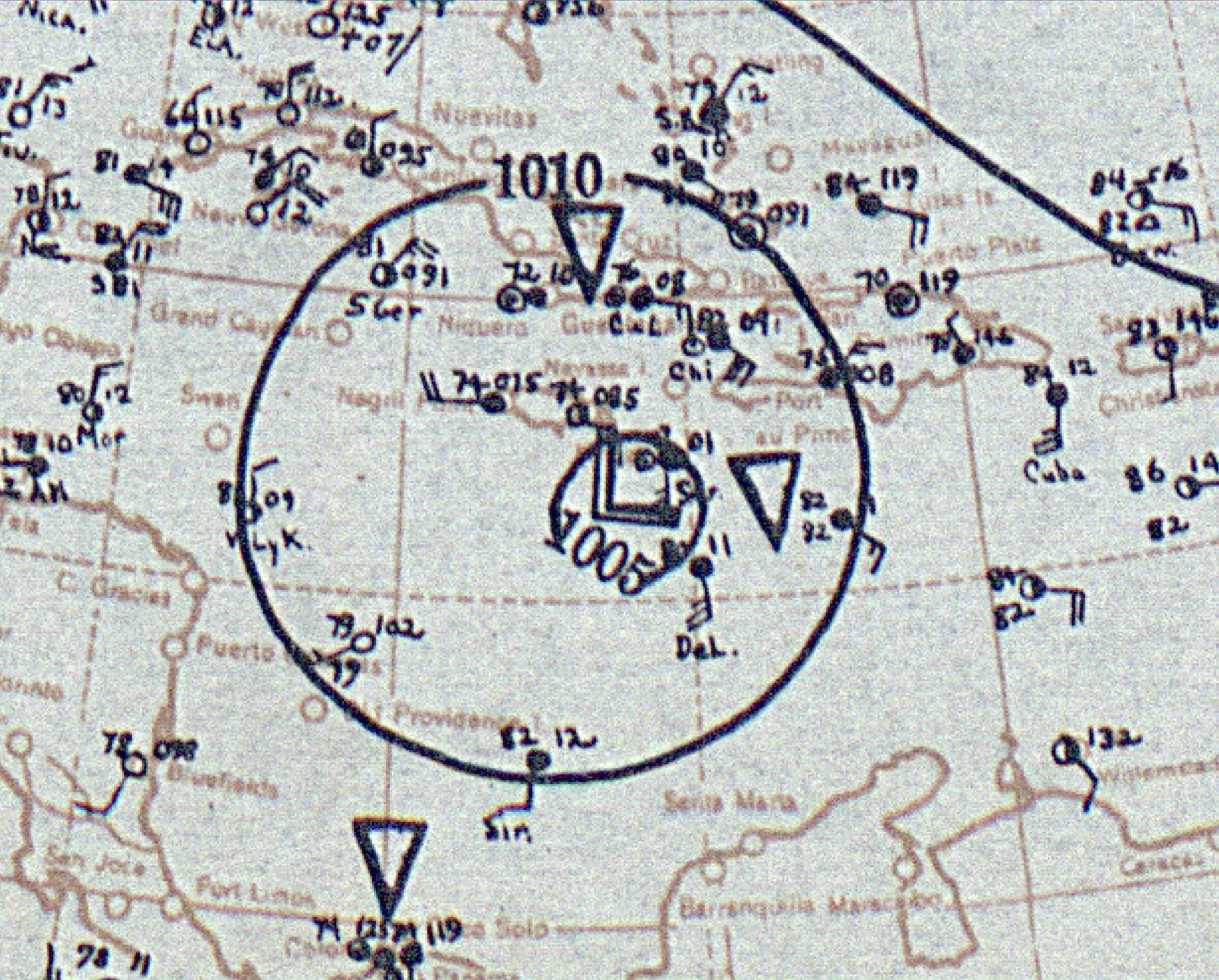
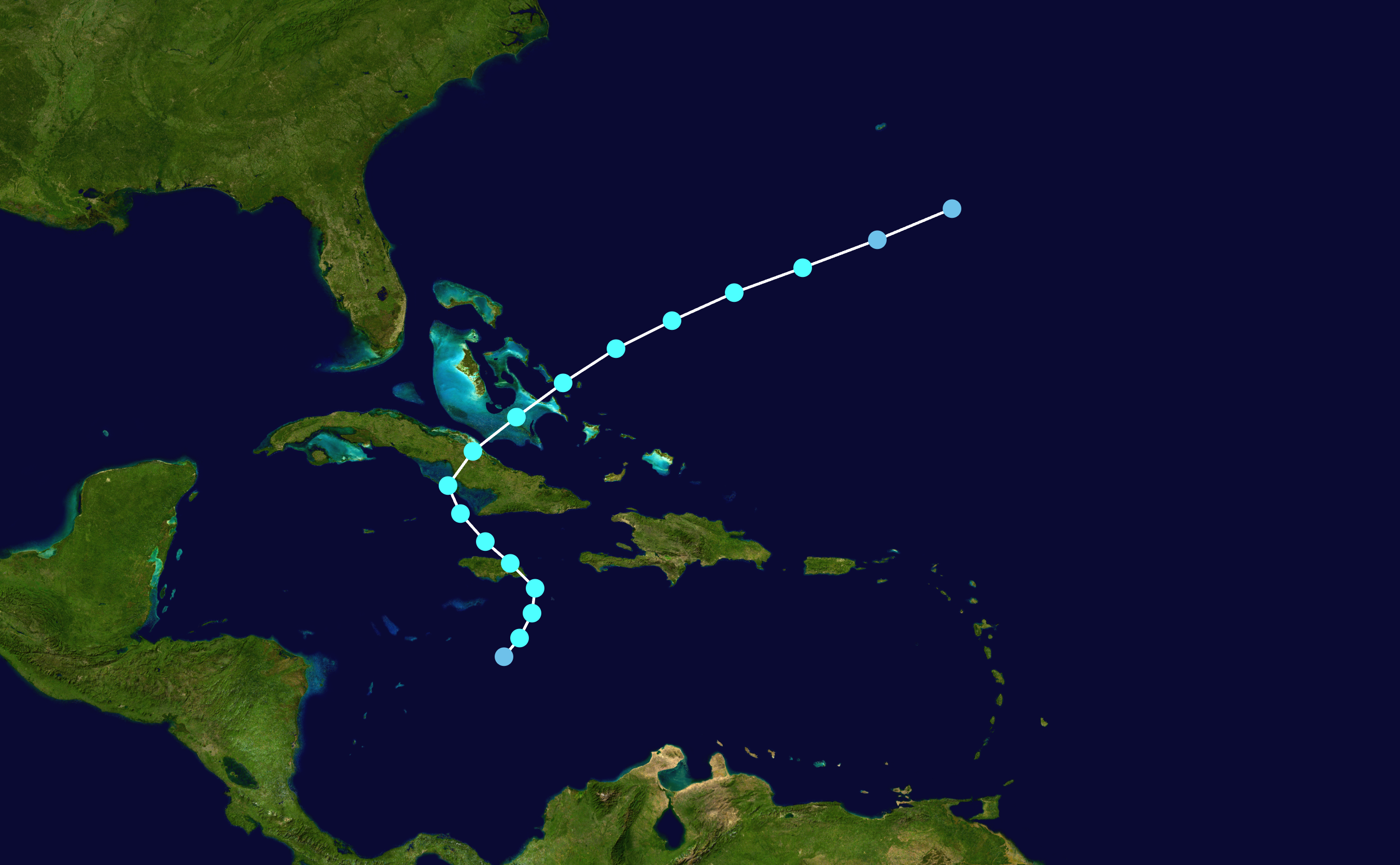
- Duration: October 19 – October 23
- Peak intensity: 45 mph (75 km/h) (1-min); 1001 mbar (hPa)

A tropical depression formed south of Jamaica around 18:00 UTC on October 19 and moved northeast, intensifying to tropical storm intensity within six hours. The lumbering storm curved toward the northwest the next day, with its center narrowly avoiding Jamaica to the north. After reaching peak winds of 45 mph (72 km/h), it once again turned northeast and made landfall in central Cuba around 14:00 UTC on October 21. Some streets across the eastern end of the island were inundated in several feet of water. The storm accelerated northeast through the Bahamas as a tropical depression or minimal tropical storm. It dissipated after 18:00 UTC on October 23 to the southeast of Bermuda.

=== Hurricane Thirteen ===
- Category 3 hurricane (SSHWS)
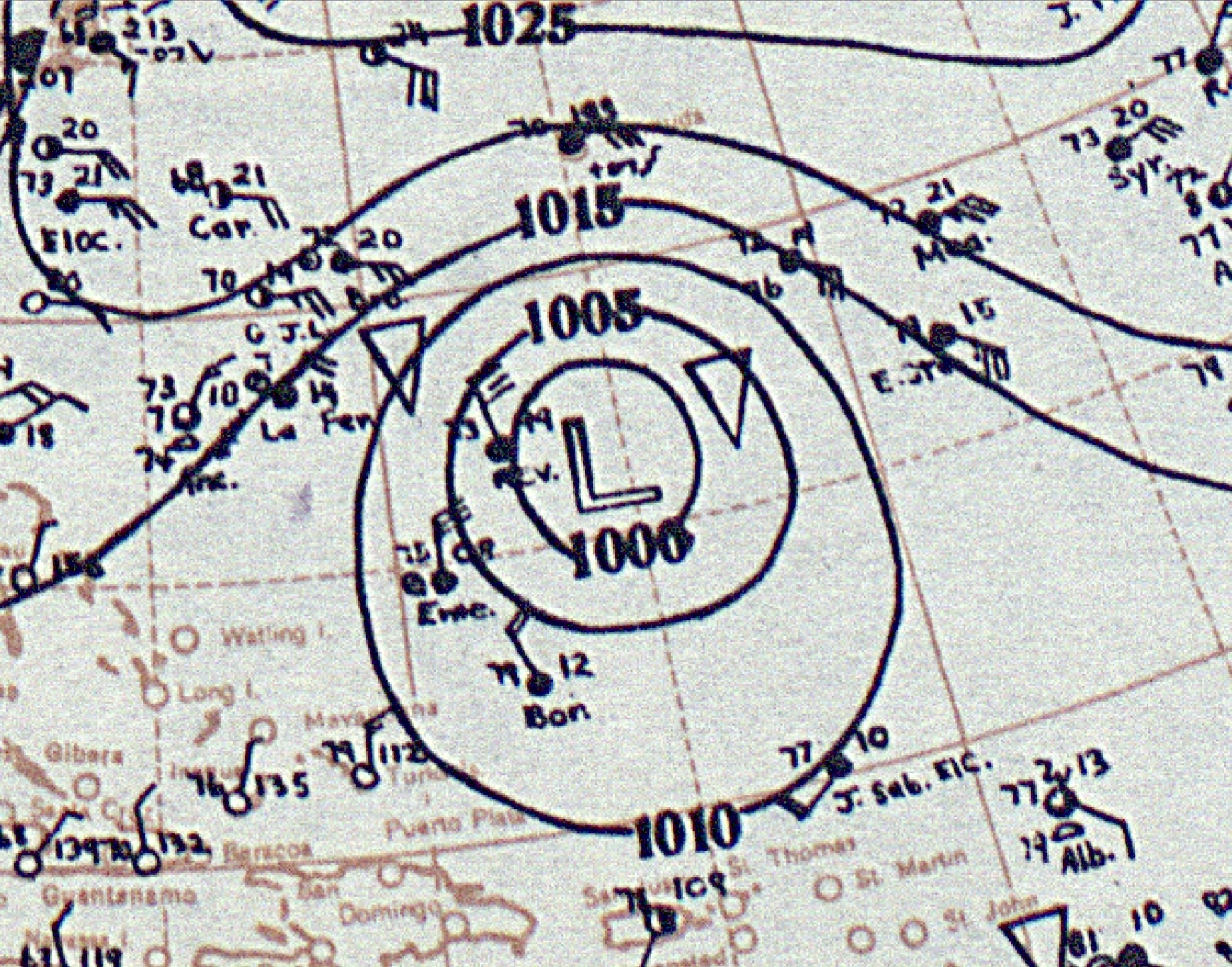
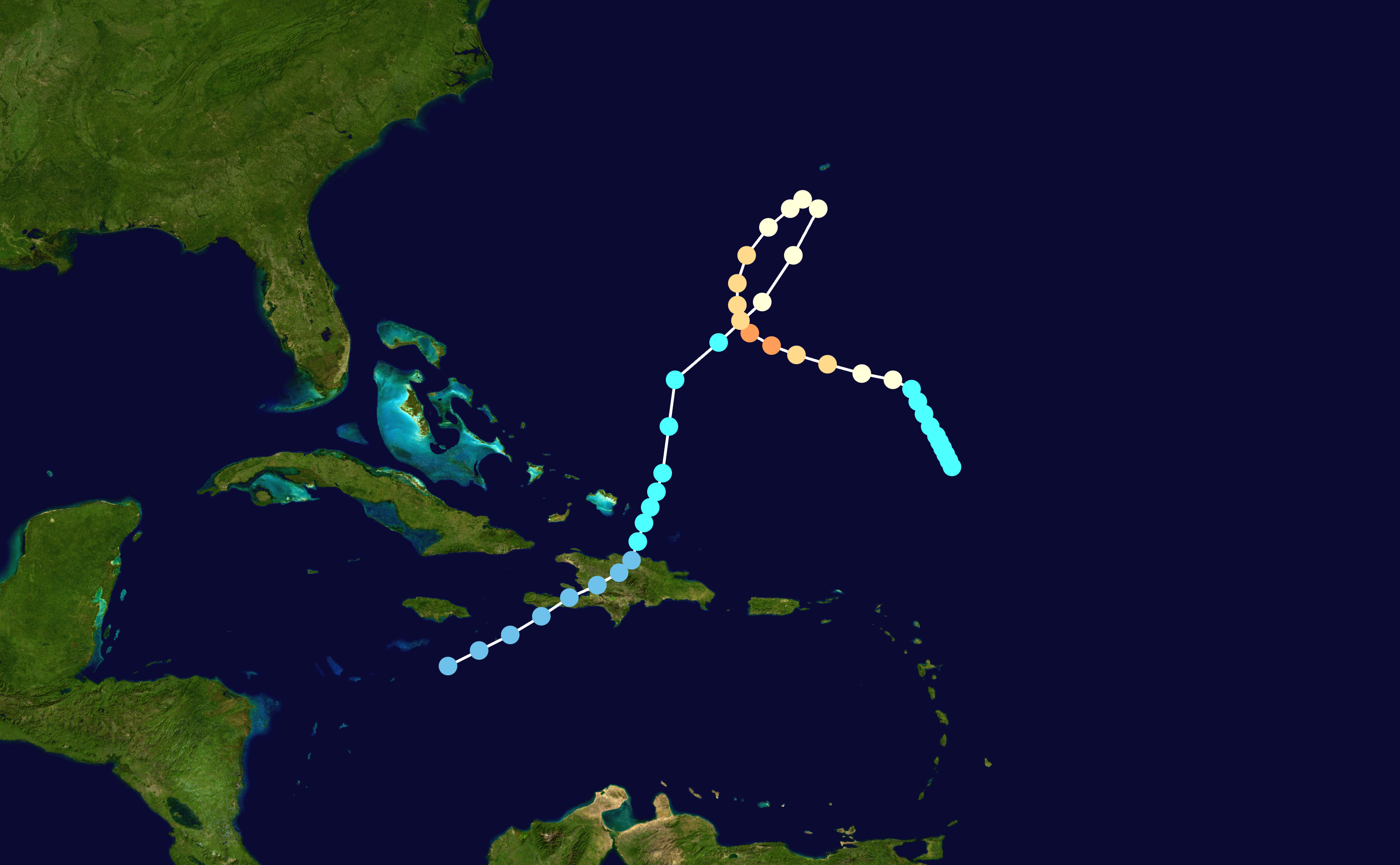
- Duration: November 20 – November 30
- Peak intensity: 115 mph (185 km/h) (1-min); 955 mbar (hPa)

The final and most intense storm of the 1934 season formed northeast of the Leeward Islands from the remnants of a trough or frontal boundary around 06:00 UTC on November 20. It moved northwest for a short time before executing a counter-clockwise loop south of Bermuda and continuing south-southwest. The Susan Maersk encountered the system to the west of island and suffered minor damage; the Malacca too intercepted the storm and saw its decks flooded. The cyclone strengthened into a hurricane late on November 22 and became the season's only major hurricane, with winds of 115 mph (185 km/h), the next afternoon. It gradually lost intensity and made landfall on the northern coast of the Dominican Republic with winds of 45 mph (72 km/h) at 16:00 UTC on November 28. The system weakened to a tropical depression but retained a closed center while crossing the island into the Caribbean Sea. It degenerated to a remnant low and dissipated south of Jamaica after 12:00 UTC on November 30.

== Season effects ==
This is a table of all the storms that have formed in the 1934 Atlantic hurricane season. It includes their duration, names, landfall(s), denoted in parentheses, damage, and death totals. Deaths in parentheses are additional and indirect (an example of an indirect death would be a traffic accident), but were still related to that storm. Damage and deaths include totals while the storm was extratropical, a wave, or a low.

Saffir–Simpson scale
TD	TS	C1	C2	C3	C4	C5

1934 North Atlantic tropical cyclones season statistics
Storm name	Dates active	Storm category at peak intensity	Max 1-min wind mph (km/h)	Min. press. (mbar)	Areas affected	Damage (US$)	Deaths	Ref(s).
One	June 4 – 18	Category 2 hurricane	100 (160)	966	Central America, Eastern United States, Eastern Canada	$4.4 million	1,000–3,000	
Two	July 12 – 16	Category 1 hurricane	90 (150)	980	None	None	None	
Three	July 22 – 26	Category 1 hurricane	85 (140)	975	Florida, Texas, Northern Mexico	$4.36 million	19	
Four	August 20 – 23	Tropical storm	40 (65)	Unknown	Leeward Islands	None	None	
Five	August 26 – September 1	Category 1 hurricane	80 (130)	989	Texas, Louisiana, Mexico	Unknown	None	
Six	September 1 – 4	Tropical storm	50 (85)	1008	North Carolina, Virginia, Maryland	Minor	None	
Seven	September 5 – 9	Category 2 hurricane	105 (165)	967	East Coast of the United States	$10,000	8	
Eight	September 16 – 23	Tropical storm	50 (85)	1010	None	None	None	
Nine	September 18 – 24	Tropical storm	60 (95)	1000	None	None	None	
Ten	October 1 – 4	Category 2 hurricane	100 (160)	984	None	Unknown	None	
Eleven	October 1 – 6	Tropical storm	60 (95)	1004	Southeastern United States	None	Minor	
Twelve	October 19 – 23	Tropical storm	45 (75)	1001	Jamaica, Cuba, the Bahamas	None	None	
Thirteen	November 20 – 30	Category 3 hurricane	115 (185)	955	Hispaniola	None	None	
Season aggregates
13 systems	June 4 – November 30		115 (185)	955		$8.77 million	1,027+	

== See also ==
- 1934 Pacific hurricane season
- 1934 Pacific typhoon season
- 1900–1950 South-West Indian Ocean cyclone seasons
- 1930s Australian region cyclone seasons
