= Del Mar Heights =

Del Mar Heights may refer to:

- Del Mar Heights, San Diego
- Del Mar Heights, Texas
