= 1938 Atlantic hurricane season =

Hurricane event

- Season summary map

Seasonal boundaries
- First system formed: January 3, 1938 (record earliest)
- Last system dissipated: November 10, 1938

Strongest storm
- Name: "Great New England Hurricane"
  - Maximum winds: 160 mph (260 km/h) (1-minute sustained)
  - Lowest pressure: 940 mbar (hPa; 27.76 inHg)

Seasonal statistics
- Total depressions: 15
- Total storms: 9
- Hurricanes: 4
- Major hurricanes (Cat. 3+): 2
- Total fatalities: >512
- Total damage: At least $620.4 million (1938 USD)

Related articles
- 1938 Pacific hurricane season; 1938 Pacific typhoon season; 1930s North Indian Ocean cyclone seasons

The 1938 Atlantic hurricane season produced fifteen tropical cyclones, of which nine strengthened into tropical storms. Four storms intensified into hurricanes. Two of those four became major hurricanes, the equivalent of a Category 3 or greater storm on the modern day Saffir–Simpson scale. The hurricane season officially began on June 16 and ended on November 15. In 2012, as part of the Atlantic hurricane reanalysis project, meteorologists identified a previously undocumented January hurricane and September tropical storm while fine-tuning the meteorological histories of several others. However, given scant observations from ships and weather stations, significant uncertainty of tropical cyclone tracks, intensity, and duration remains, particularly for those storms that stayed at sea.

Seasonal activity began with the formation of a tropical or subtropical cyclone over the northeastern Atlantic on January 3, the earliest occurrence in a calendar year (earliest start to a season) on record. In mid-August, a hurricane struck near Cameron, Louisiana, producing strong winds and water level rises that caused $245,550 in damage throughout that state and Texas. (Note: All monetary figures are in their 1938 values unless otherwise noted.) It was followed in quick succession by an even more potent hurricane that tracked through the Caribbean, Gulf of Mexico, and into northern Mexico. There, 9 people were killed and over 400 families were left homeless. An additional 4 deaths occurred in Texas. The season's strongest and most destructive system, the "Great New England Hurricane", swept into New England, where 494–700 people were killed, over 1,700 individuals were injured, and about 23,900 structures were damaged or destroyed. The cost was estimated at $620 million. It was the strongest hurricane to hit New England in over 300 years, since 1635. Later in the season, a minimal mid-October tropical storm affected Texas and Louisiana, and a stronger early-November tropical storm caused minor damage along the eastern coastline of Florida.

The season's activity was reflected with an accumulated cyclone energy (ACE) rating of 78 units, below the 1931–1943 average of 91.2. ACE is a metric used to express the energy used by a tropical cyclone during its lifetime. Therefore, a storm with a longer duration will have high values of ACE. It is only calculated at six-hour increments in which specific tropical and subtropical systems are either at or above sustained wind speeds of 39 mph (63 km/h), which is the threshold for tropical storm intensity. Thus, tropical depressions are not included here.

== Systems ==
=== Hurricane One ===
- Category 1 hurricane (SSHWS)
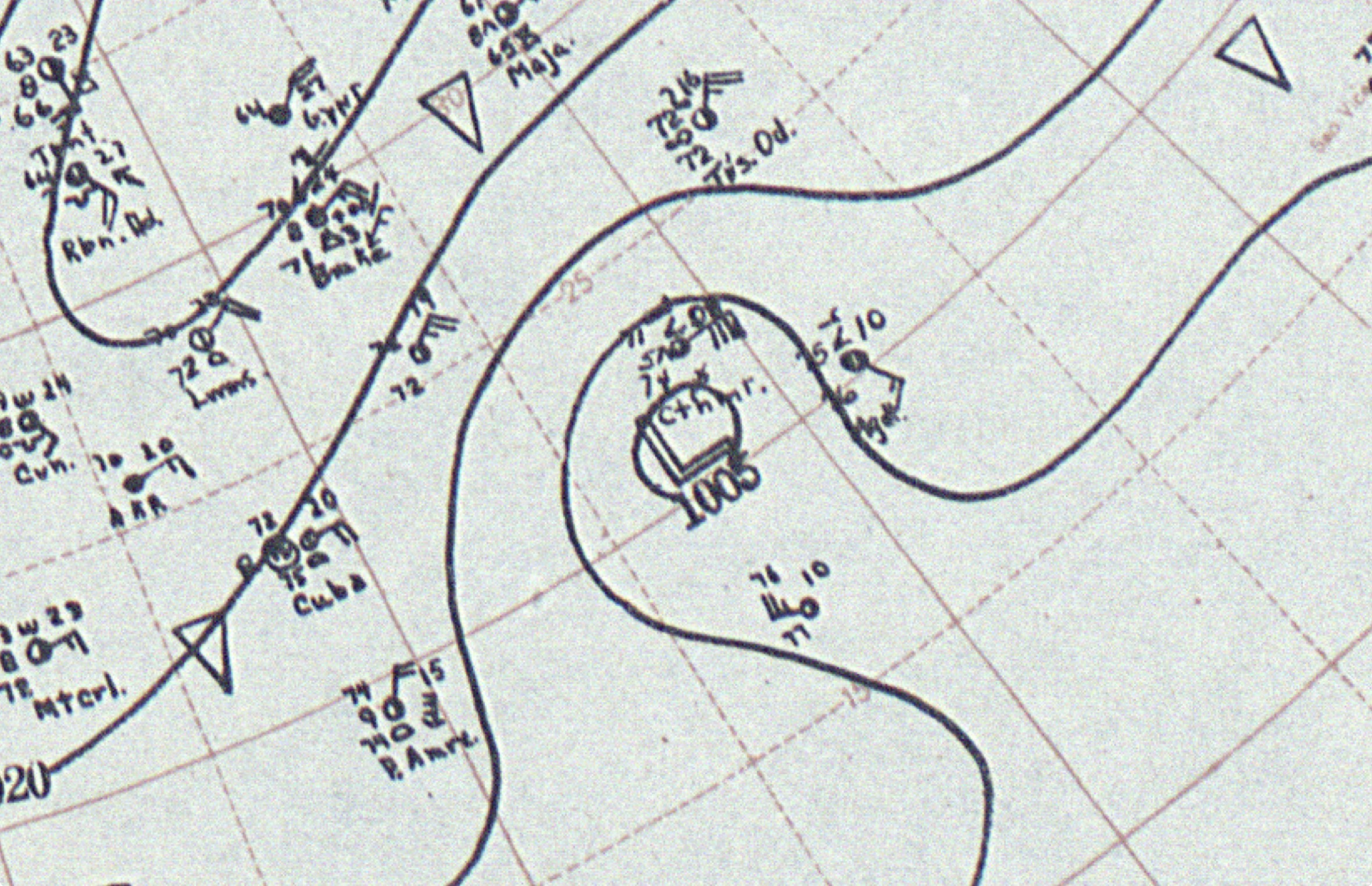
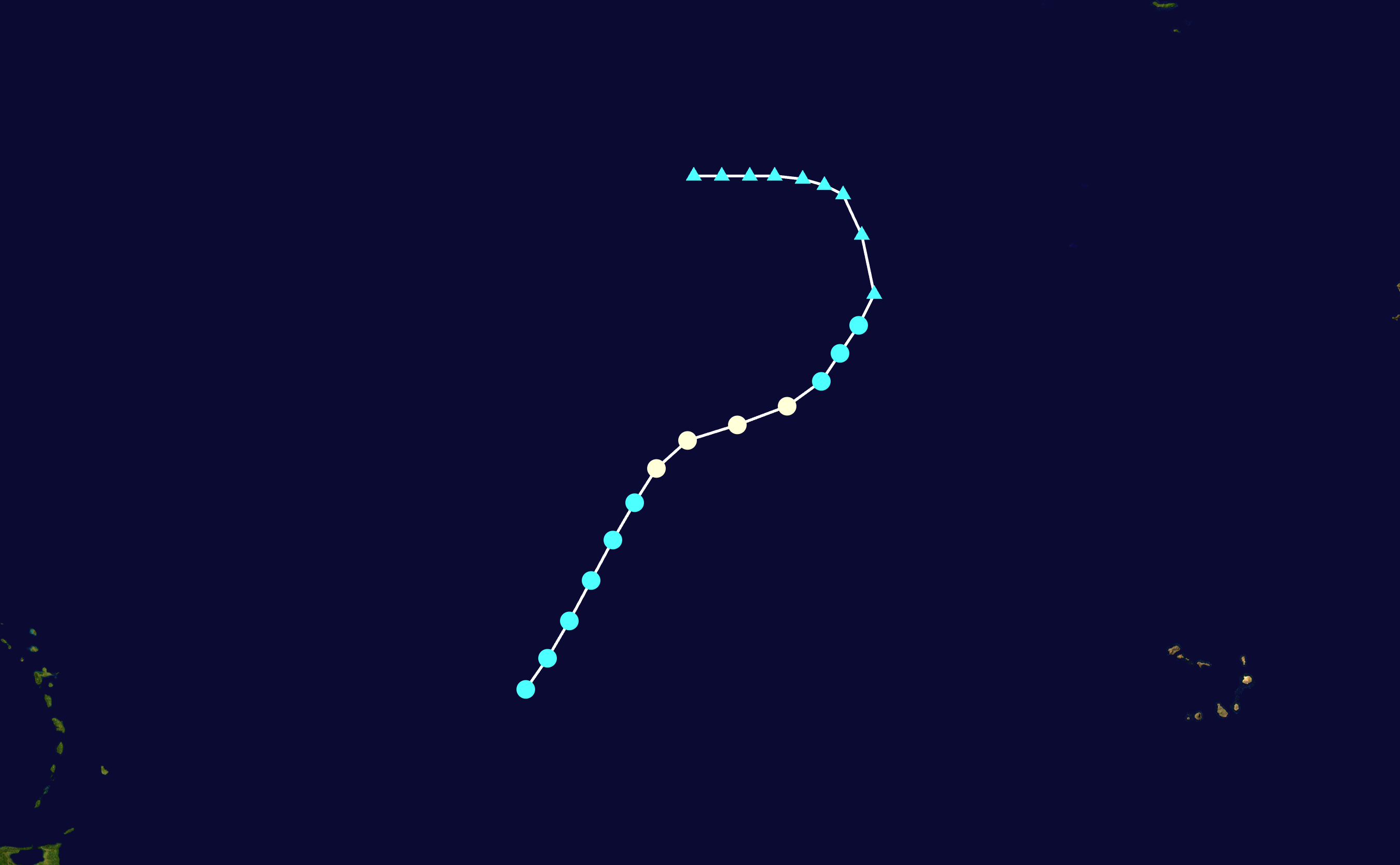
- Duration: January 3 – January 6
- Peak intensity: 80 mph (130 km/h) (1-min); ≤992 mbar (hPa)

In 2012, as part of their ongoing Atlantic hurricane reanalysis project, the National Hurricane Center identified a previously undocumented hurricane. On January 1, an extratropical cyclone formed over the northeastern Atlantic along the tail-end of a cold front. The cyclone initially moved east but soon turned south then west by January 3. Warm air coalesced in the vicinity of the storm, and the frontal boundary dissipated, leading to the formation of a tropical storm by 18:00 UTC on January 3 about 850 miles (1,370 km) southwest of the Azores. It is possible, however, that the system existed as a subtropical cyclone before transitioning into a fully tropical entity. The storm temporarily embarked on a more westerly course before banking south-southwest, through which time it intensified into a Category 1 hurricane, peaking with winds of 80 mph (130 km/h). Gradual weakening ensued as the cyclone entered the deep tropical Atlantic east of the Leeward Islands, with its final point recognized at 18:00 UTC on January 6.

The cyclone is one of only two hurricanes to form in the Atlantic basin during the month of January, alongside Hurricane Alex in 2016. Hurricane Alice attained hurricane strength in January 1955 but developed the previous month. Additionally, it is one of only seven tropical or subtropical cyclones to persist during the month, including the aforementioned systems, a tropical storm in 1951, a subtropical storm in 1978, Tropical Storm Zeta in 2006, and a subtropical storm in 2023.

=== Tropical Storm Two ===
- Tropical storm (SSHWS)
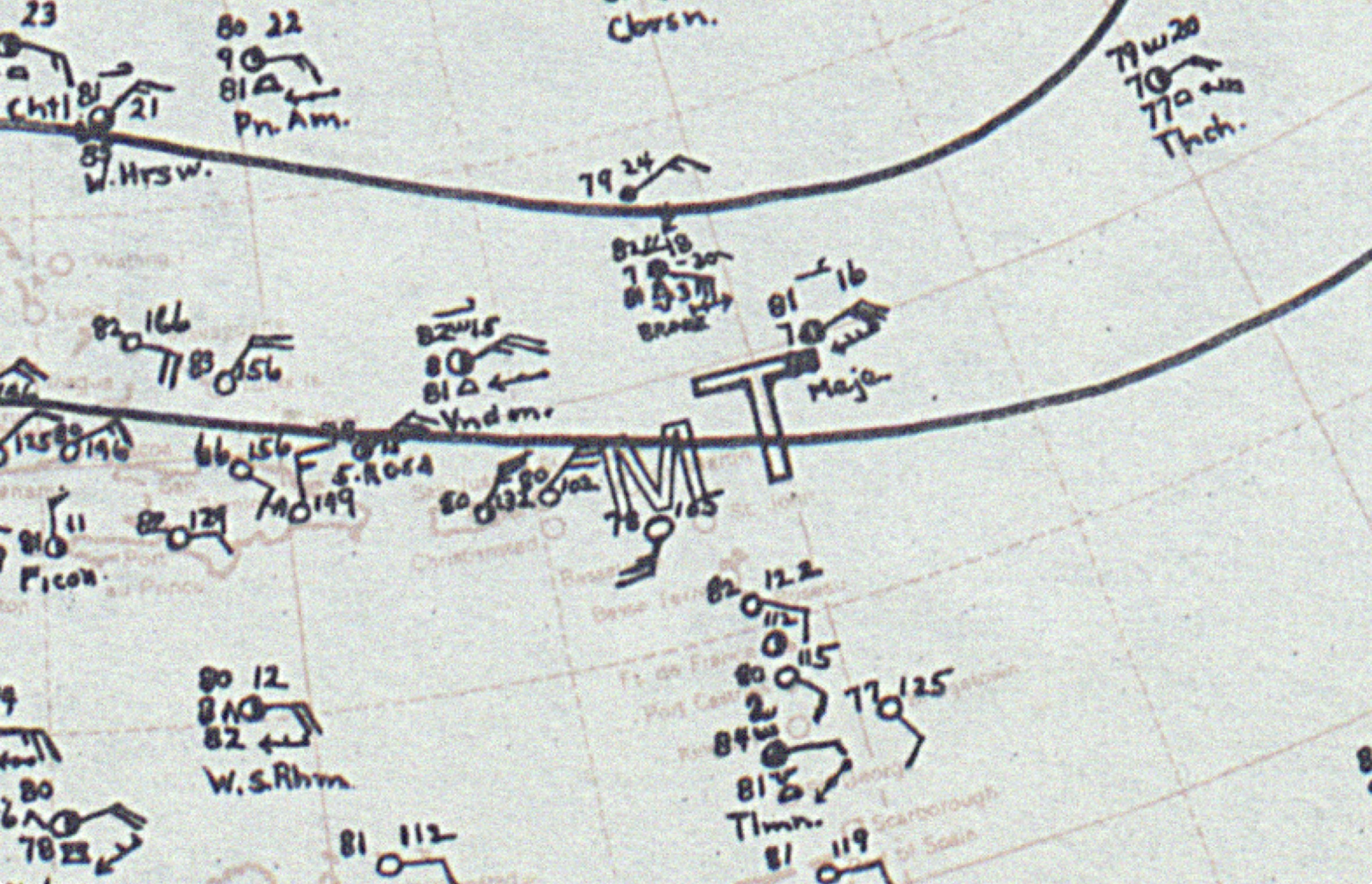
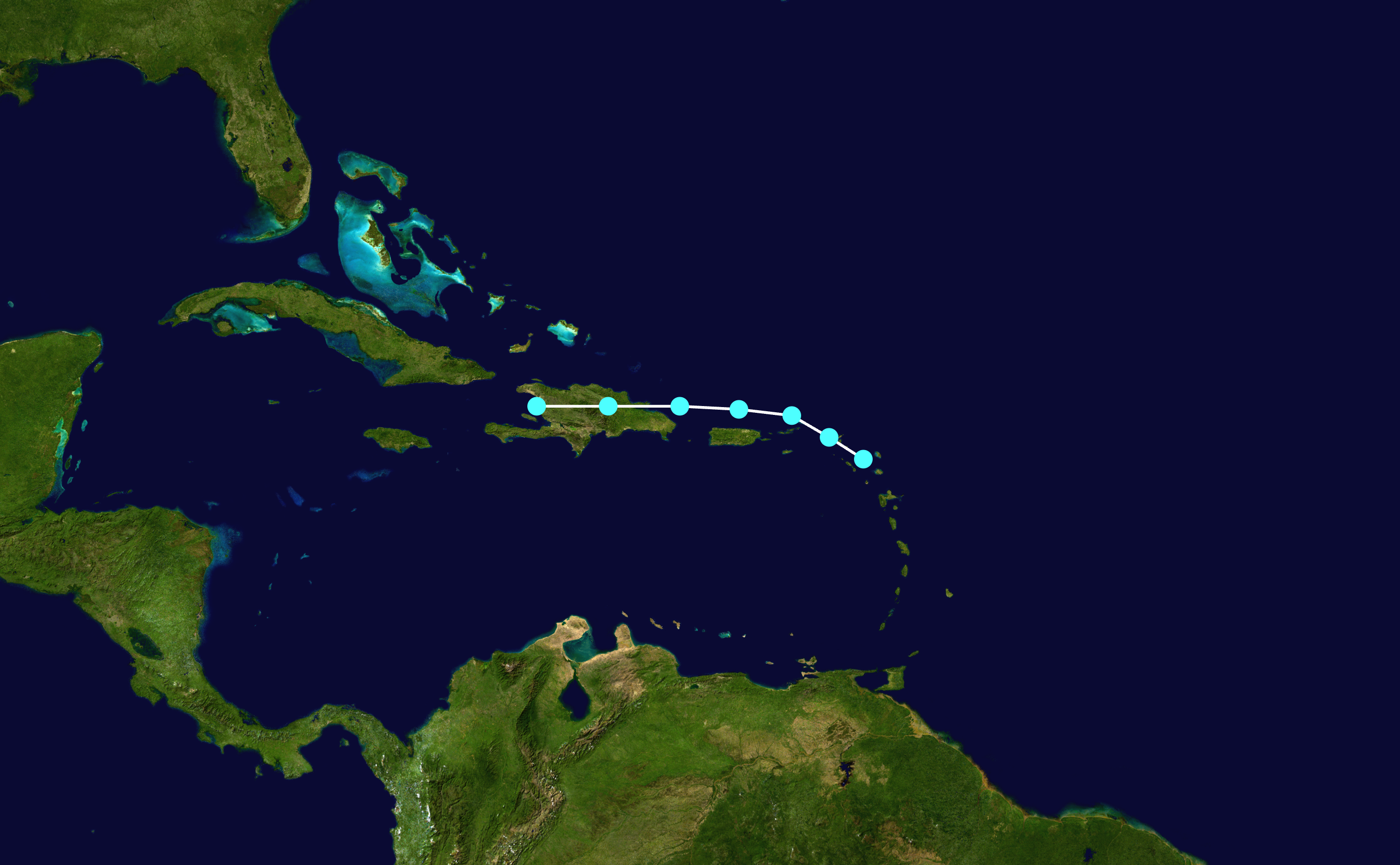
- Duration: August 8 – August 9
- Peak intensity: 70 mph (110 km/h) (1-min); 1002 mbar (hPa)

A strong tropical storm with peak winds of 70 mph (110 km/h) was first identified just west of Antigua and Barbuda at 06:00 UTC on August 8, though it may have developed days earlier in the absence of a reliable data network. The rapidly-moving system curved west, passing north of Puerto Rico before striking the northeastern coastline of the Dominican Republic as a 50 mph (80 km/h) cyclone at 09:00 UTC on August 9. The storm continued across Hispaniola and dissipated after 18:00 UTC that day, though the remnant tropical wave continued on to impact Cuba on August 10.

=== Hurricane Three ===
- Category 2 hurricane (SSHWS)
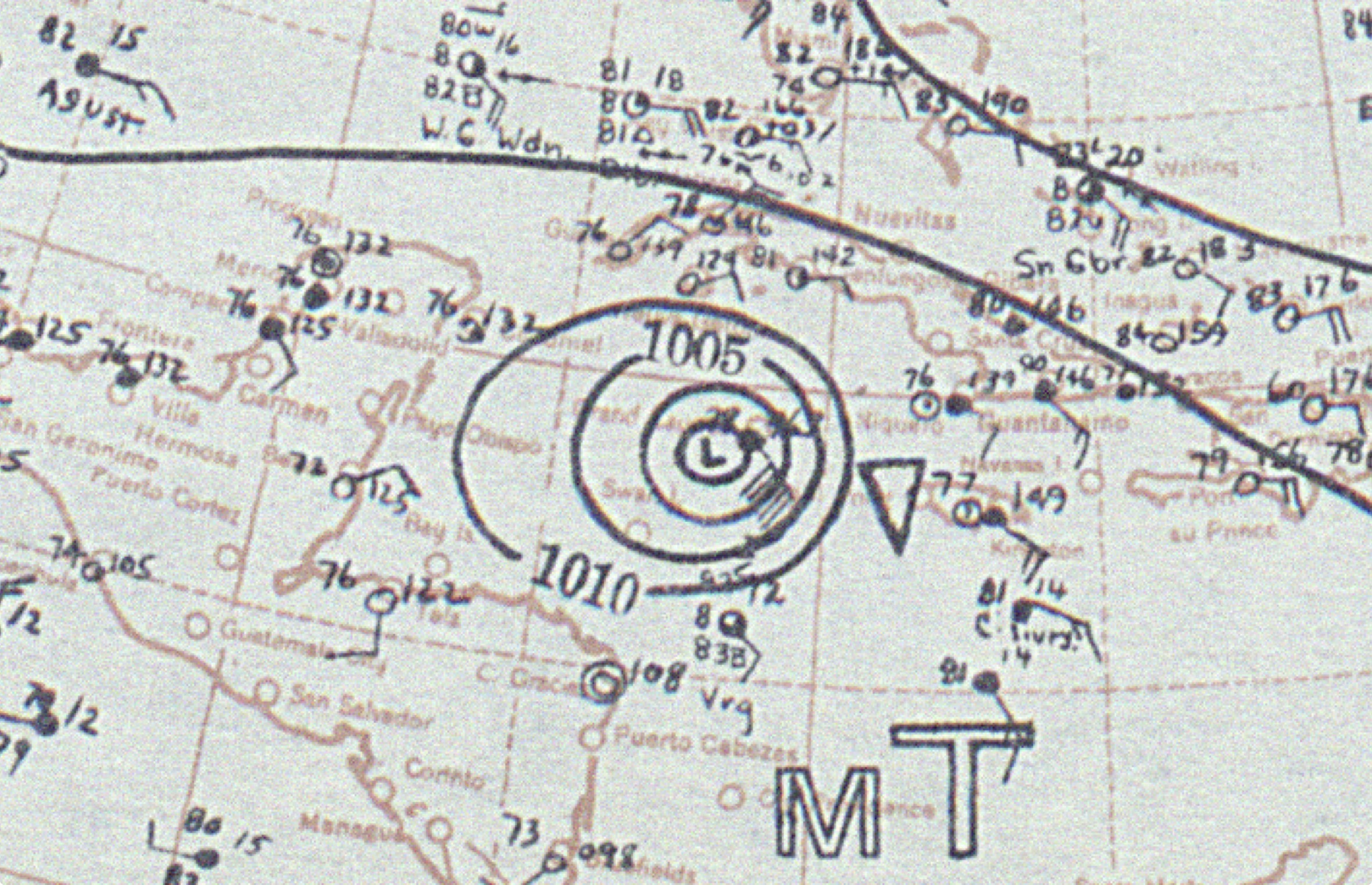
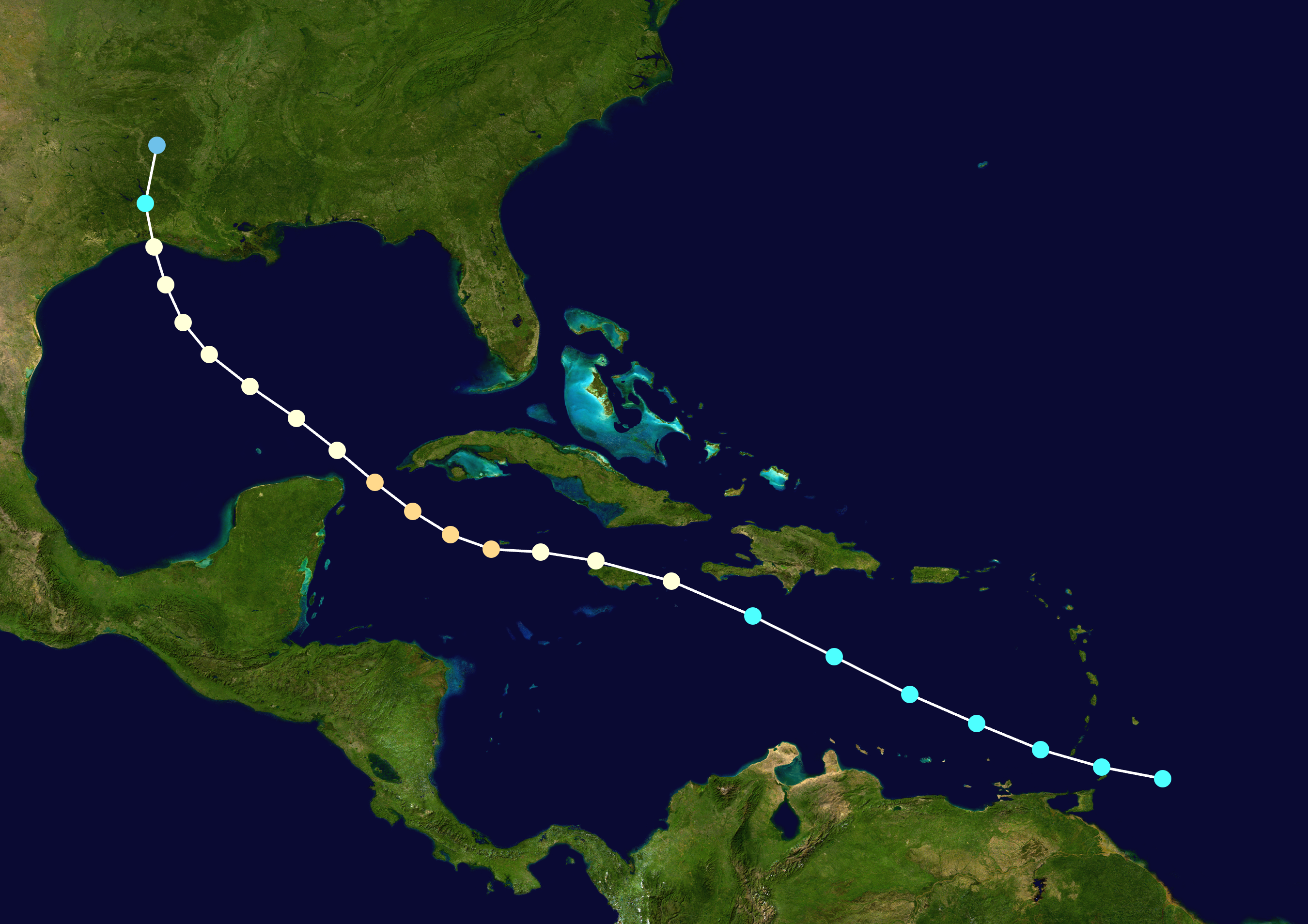
- Duration: August 10 – August 15
- Peak intensity: 100 mph (155 km/h) (1-min); ~995 mbar (hPa)

Around 00:00 UTC on August 10, a rapidly-moving tropical storm was identified southeast of Barbados. It tracked into the Caribbean Sea and intensified into the season's second hurricane, with the center of the storm narrowly missing Jamaica to the north late on August 11. Observations from Grand Cayman indicate that it strengthened into a Category 2 hurricane, reaching peak winds of 100 mph (160 km/h) that day, before the system slowly weakened. It moved through the Yucatán Channel and into the Gulf of Mexico, making a later landfall just west of Cameron, Louisiana, at 01:00 UTC on August 15 with winds of 75 mph (121 km/h). The cyclone curved north-northeast and was last observed as a weak tropical depression along the Arkansas–Louisiana border at 12:00 UTC on August 15.

Along the northern fringes of Jamaica, appreciable loss to cultivation occurred. Winds at nearby Grand Cayman topped at 95 mph (153 km/h), destroying nine houses and injuring several people. In the United States, sustained winds southeast of Lake Charles, Louisiana, reached 55 mph (89 km/h) and gusts peaked around 60 mph (97 km/h). There, windows were blown from the city hall and upper floor of several downtown structures. Small vessels were overturned, and the downing of trees and signs obstructed highways. A grandstand and fence at the American Legion ballpark were smashed, as well as two planes at the Lake Charles Regional Airport. Hurricane-force winds were estimated in nearby Grand Chenier. Squalls caused damage to structures in Benton and overturned a boat on Cross Lake, causing a man to drown. Another man was found drowned on the western edge of the Calcasieu River. Five people were rescued from their motor boat on Lake Pontchartrain. A small tornado moved through Kinder, causing $2,000 in damage after it destroyed a house and toppled two barns, fencing, and some trees. Throughout the state, the winds caused damage to buildings, wires, oil derricks, piers, and other structures totaling to $133,000. Water levels of 4–5 ft (1.2–1.5 m) above the mean low tide inundated the coasts of Cameron and Vermillion parishes, and lowlands were flooded to a depth of 1–4 ft (0.30–1.22 m). Shrimp boats were beached near Creole, and the Intracoastal Ferry—carrying four cars amounting to 20 people—broke its cable, crashing onto a river bank. Torrential rainfall, peaking at 14.9 inches (380 mm) in Koll, caused extensive damage to crops; the rice, cotton, and corn crops in particular were heavily affected, with total damage estimated at $110,000. Several cities saw 24-hour rainfall records. Considerable damage to highways was also noted, with detours or interruption to traffic for 20–40 miles (32–64 km) east of the center, particularly in Jefferson Davis Parish. In Texas, damage was confined to the Sabine Pass area, where the cost to piers and highways reached $550. Communications between Port Arthur and Galveston were severed.

=== Hurricane Four ===
- Category 3 hurricane (SSHWS)
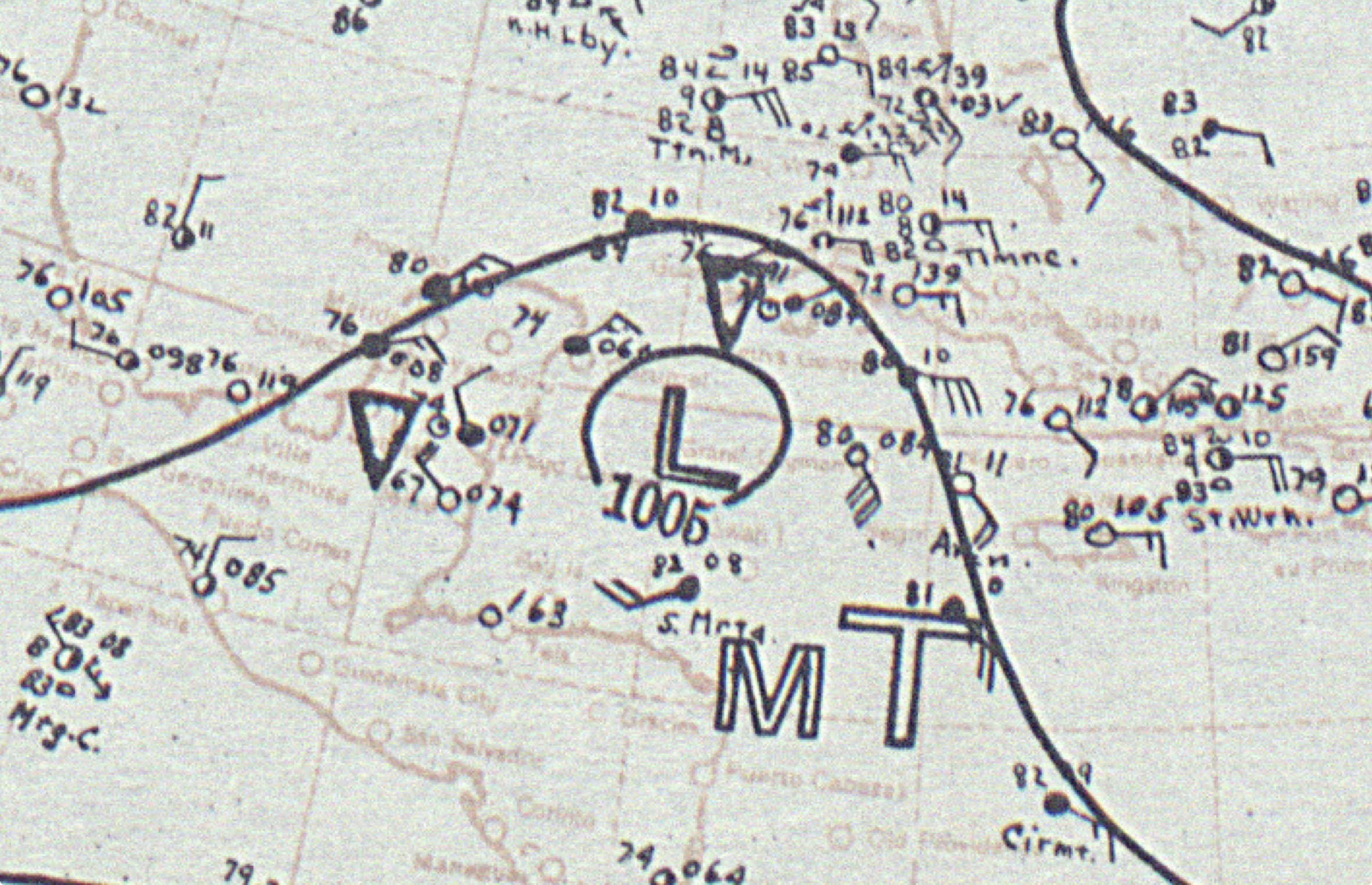
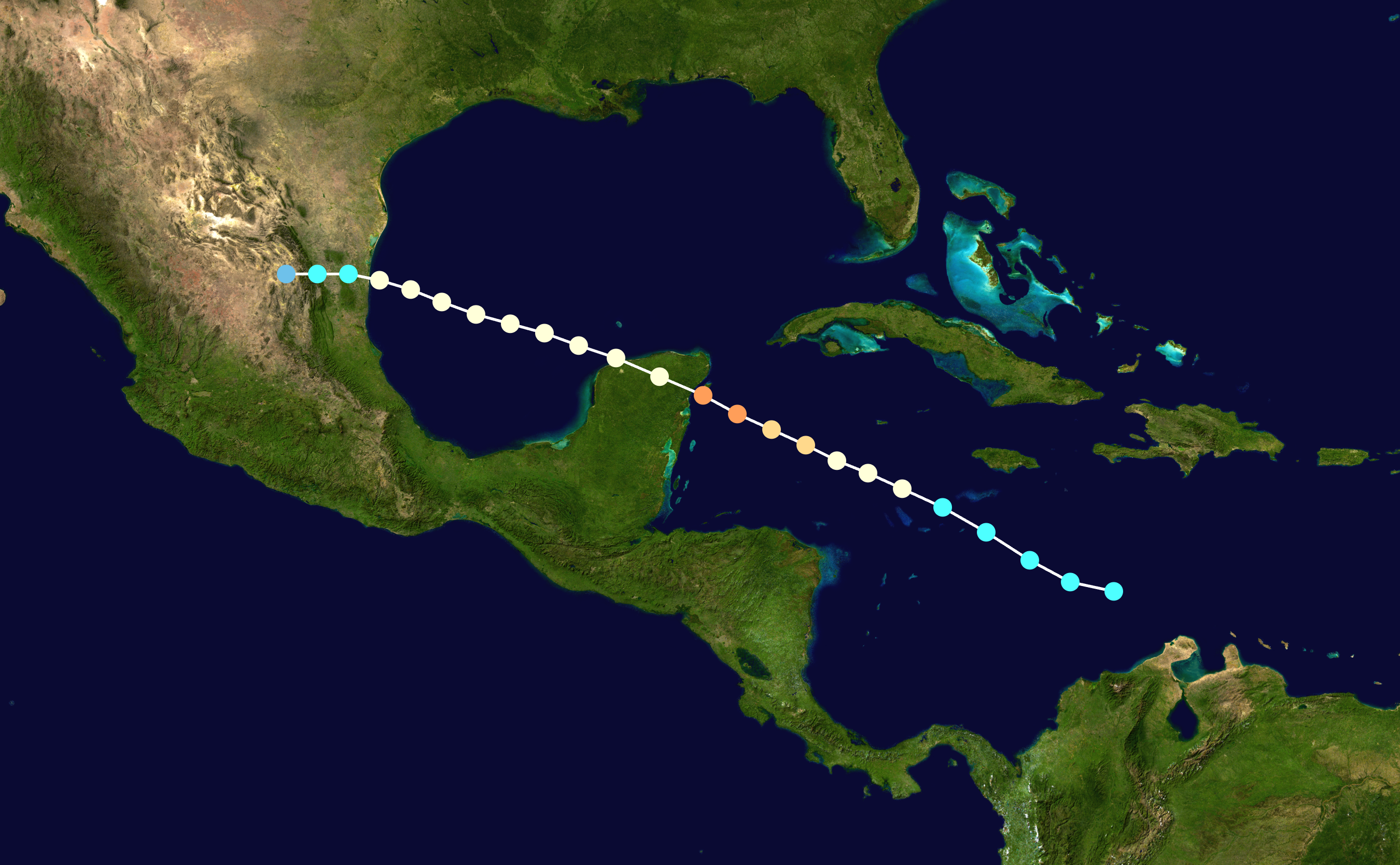
- Duration: August 23 – August 29
- Peak intensity: 120 mph (195 km/h) (1-min); ≤964 mbar (hPa)

A tropical storm first developed to the south of Haiti by 06:00 UTC on August 23 and moved west-northwest, a trajectory it maintained throughout its duration. The system intensified into a hurricane shortly after passing south of Jamaica and Grand Cayman on August 24. As it passed south of Cozumel, the island recorded winds of 91 mph (146 km/h). The storm reached its peak as a Category 3 hurricane with winds of 120 mph (190 km/h) around 02:00 UTC on August 26, while making landfall along the Yucatán Peninsula. It weakened to Category 1 intensity as it crossed land and emerged into the southern Gulf of Mexico, later moving ashore the coast of Tamaulipas with winds of 85 mph (137 km/h) at 08:00 UTC on August 28. It is possible the storm could have been stronger given the size of the storm surge farther north in southern Texas. The cyclone curved west after tracking inland and became a remnant low after 00:00 UTC on August 29.

Thousands of banana trees were destroyed by 40 mph (64 km/h) winds across six districts in Jamaica; this accounted for roughly 5% of the island's crop, though some areas locally saw losses as high as 20%. In Portland, Jamaica, hundreds of banana and breadfruit trees were blown down in a 15-minute period. Considerable property damage was also wrought on the island, marked by the loss of some homes and the unroofing of others. Roads were blocked by landslides triggered by heavy rains. Shipping and airmail services were disrupted as ships and planes were held during the storm's passage. Telegraph communications were also subject to disruptions as the storm passed. Winds reached 56 mph (90 km/h) on Grand Cayman on the night of August 24. Communications with Cozumel were lost late on August 25, before the onset of the worst conditions. High winds toppled numerous trees and destroyed at least 200 homes. However, the overall damage toll on the Yucatán Peninsula was lessened by the relatively low population density of the peninsula's northeastern coast.

After the hurricane struck the coastline of northern Mexico, local observers reported a 75–80 miles (121–129 km) swath of damage along the beach in La Pesca. Palm-thatched huts were badly damaged or collapsed. Further inland, up to 9 in (230 mm) of rain in a few hours caused creeks and rivers, particularly the Rio Grande, to rapidly rise. Waters rose over 18 ft (5.5 m) to their highest level in six years, over-spilling into farmlands near Matamoros, Tamaulipas after a levee was breached and inundating multiple areas on the Mexican side of the United States–Mexico border near McAllen, Texas. Nine people were killed, including eight who were swept away by floodwaters and one whose body was recovered from a home ravaged by wind and floodwater. The vehicles of several American tourists were engulfed by the Santa Catarina River on the road between Mexico City and Ciudad Victoria. The latter city was isolated from the remainder of Mexico. More than 400 families were left homeless. The military and local officials transformed public buildings into temporary shelters. In Texas, squalls produced winds estimated up to 45 mph (72 km/h). A sizable storm surge swept across Padre Island and Brazos Island and washed away a few inexpensive structures in Del Mar Heights. Rainfall across the extreme southern sections of the state was received as beneficial to dry crops. However, this rain exacerbated floodwaters within the river to breach a levee in Cameron County, where two people were drowned and swept away in Los Indios. Three more people died near El Paso in an attempted river crossing. Farther west in Albuquerque, New Mexico, rainfall totaling 1.66 inches (42 mm) eroded unpaved side roads and inundated the basements of homes and stores.

=== Tropical Storm Five ===
- Tropical storm (SSHWS)
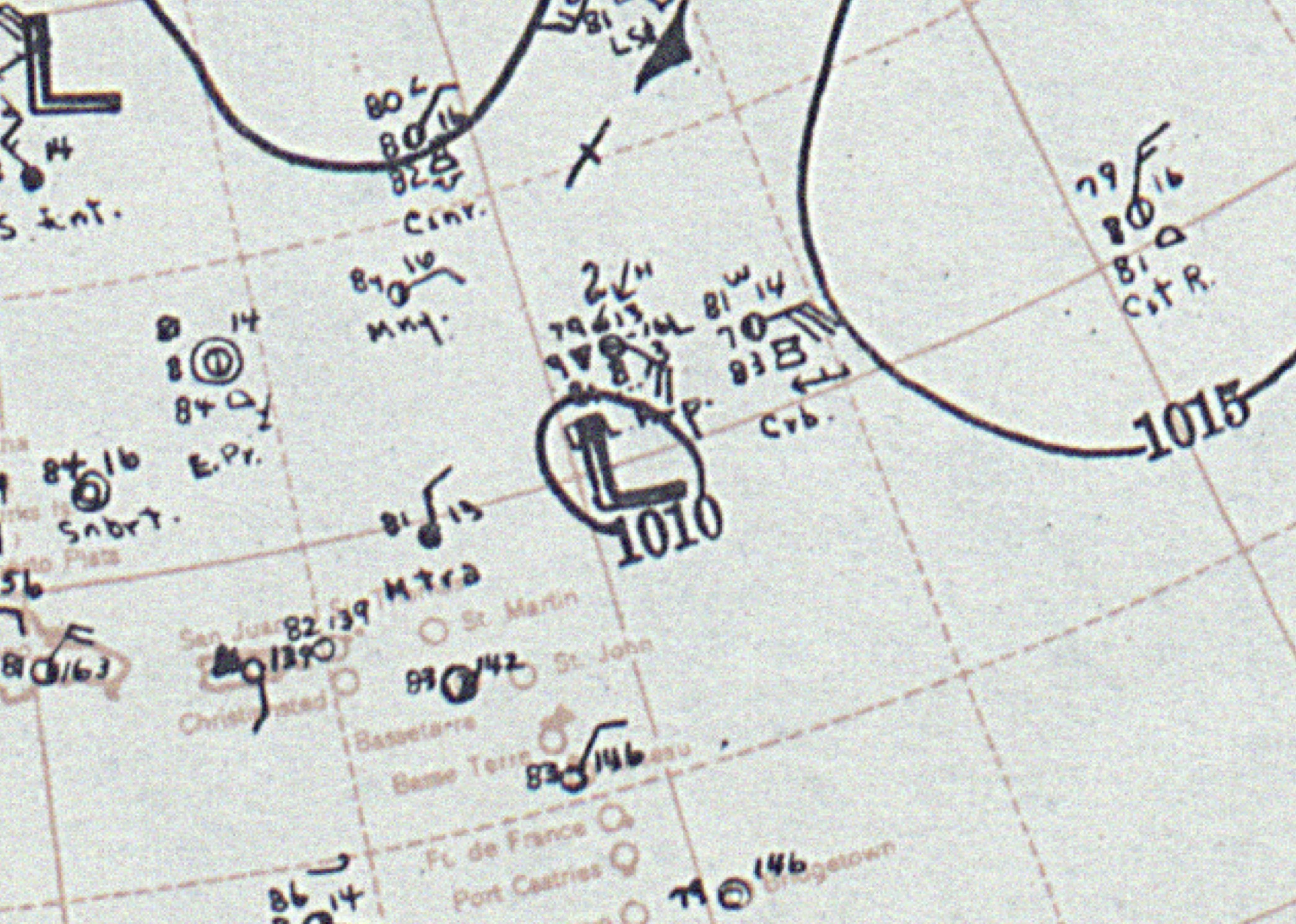
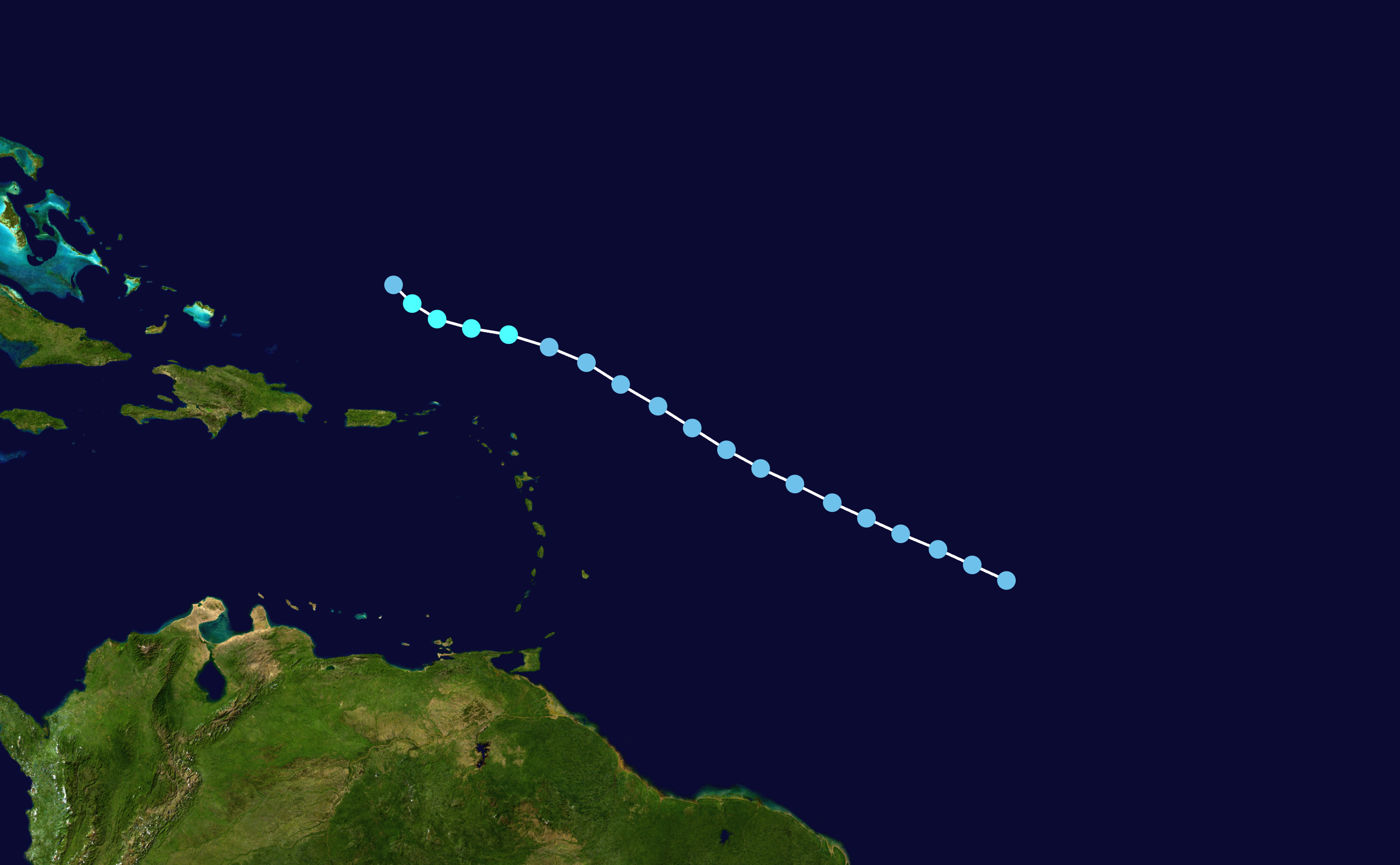
- Duration: September 9 – September 14
- Peak intensity: 40 mph (65 km/h) (1-min); 1009 mbar (hPa)

A tropical wave moved off the western coast of Africa around September 4 and moved westward, spawning a tropical depression about 910 miles (1,460 km) east of Barbados by 12:00 UTC on September 9. The newly formed cyclone tracked west-northwest and maintained tropical depression intensity for several days. By 00:00 UTC on September 13, data from nearby ships was sufficient to upgrade it to a tropical storm with peak winds of 40 mph (64 km/h). The system curved poleward and weakened while interacting with a broad trough or area of low pressure. Its final point has been analyzed a few hundred miles north of Puerto Rico after 00:00 UTC on September 14. This system was discovered the during the Atlantic reanalysis project in 2012.

=== Hurricane Six ===
- Category 5 hurricane (SSHWS)
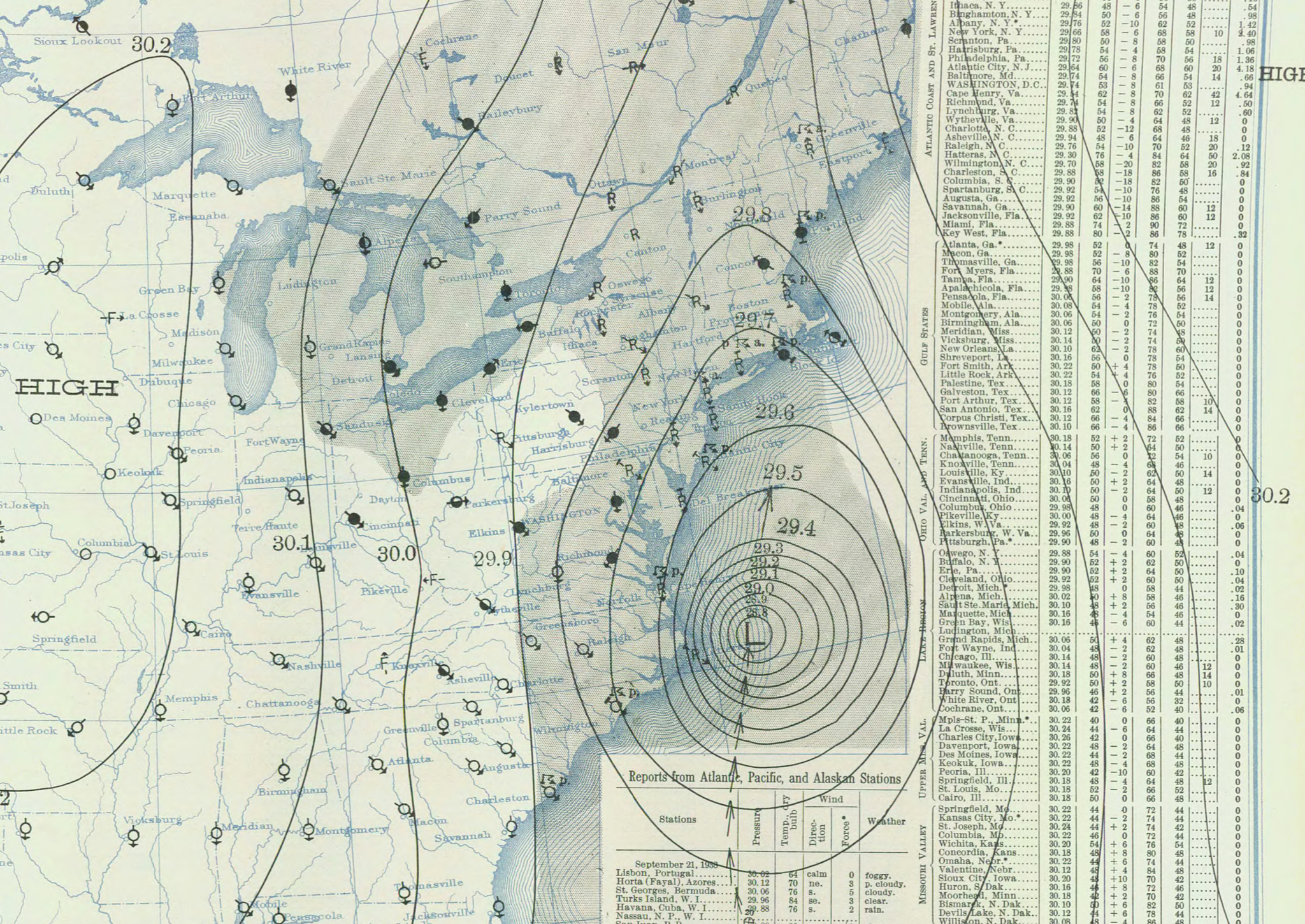
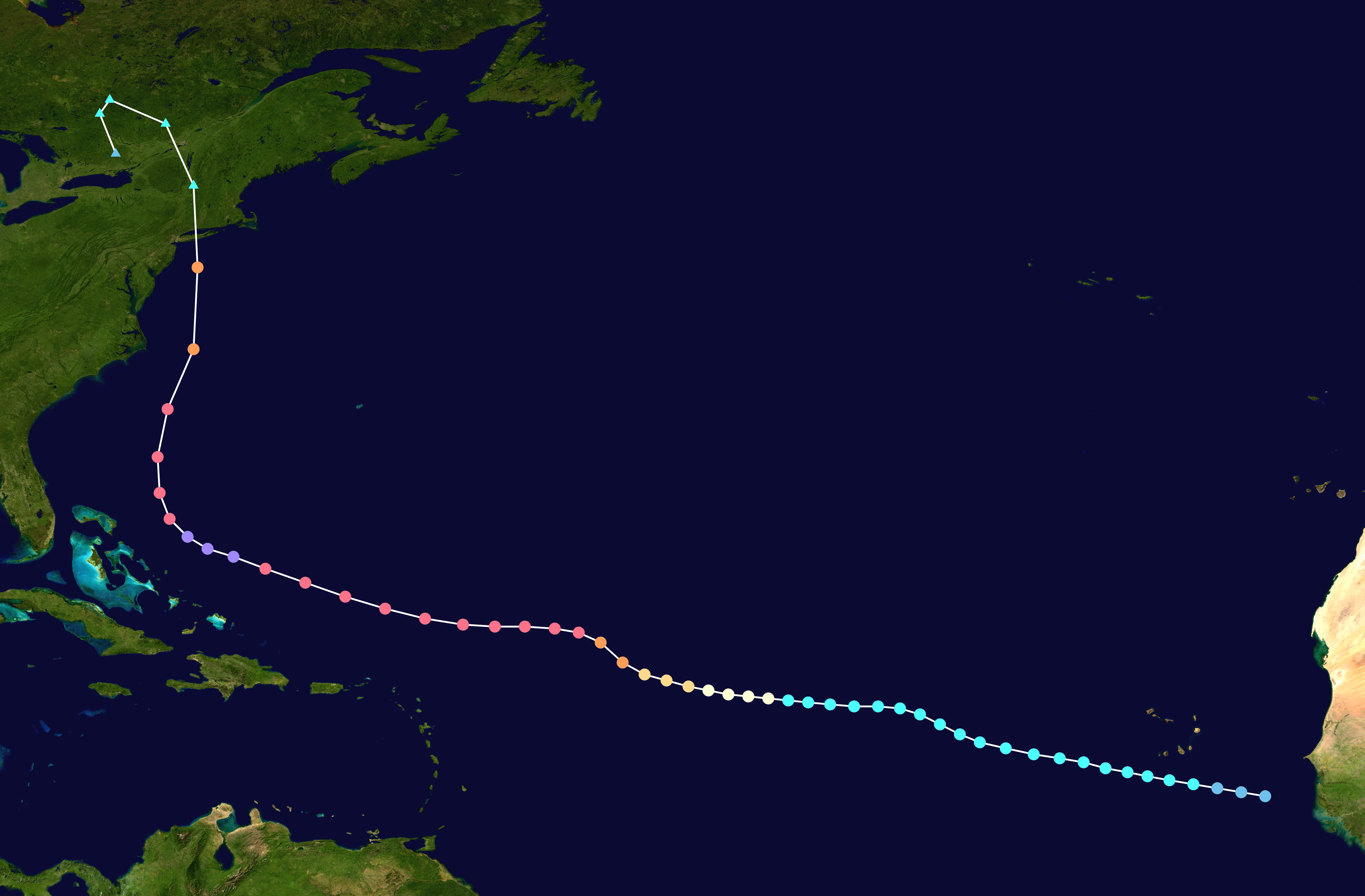
- Duration: September 9 – September 21
- Peak intensity: 160 mph (260 km/h) (1-min); ≤940 mbar (hPa)

A tropical depression developed off the coastline of western Africa around 12:00 UTC on September 9 and embarked on a west-northwest course, steered by a large upper-level ridge to its north. As it traversed the Atlantic Ocean for nearly two weeks, data from numerous ships was used to identify the system as a tropical storm on September 10, and as a hurricane on September 15. Later, on September 19, various ships to the east of the Bahamas reported Category 5 wind speeds of 160 mph (260 km/h). A large high pressure system over the Canadian Maritimes blocked the hurricane from moving out to sea, while a trough of low pressure over the East Coast of the United States caused it to curve northward and reach a rapid forward speed of over 60 mph (95 km/h). The powerful storm made two landfalls on September 21, first on Long Island at 19:45 UTC with winds of 120 mph (195 km/h) and second near New Haven, Connecticut, at 20:40 UTC with winds of 115 mph (185 km/h). Although it is still analyzed as a hurricane at these landfalls, the system is believed to have been losing tropical characteristics. It completed extratropical transition over southern Vermont by 00:00 UTC on September 22. Its remnants then moved through Quebec and later dissipated over arctic Canada.

Residents of New England received little advanced notice of the hurricane's approach. The U.S. Weather Bureau had issued warnings for Florida on September 20, but none were issued further north up the coast, as forecasters assumed that the usual path for systems at that time of the year and turn out to sea. A storm surge of 17 ft (5.2 m) was recorded along the Connecticut coast, while storm tides of 18–25 ft (5.5–7.6 m) lashed the Rhode Island coastline. The Blue Hill Meteorological Observatory in Massachusetts recorded peak sustained winds of 121 mph (195 km/h), gusting to 186 mph (299 km/h); the highest sustained wind measurement not influenced by terrain was 109 mph (175 km/h) at Fishers Island, New York. About 20,000 mi (32,000 km) of power and telephone lines were toppled on Long Island alone. In New York City, sustained winds of 120 mph (195 km/h) buffeted the top of the Empire State Building; sustained winds at ground level in Central Park were 60 mph (95 km/h). Wave heights reached 50 ft (15 m) in Gloucester, Massachusetts. Several inches of rain occurred throughout New England, peaking at 12.77 in (0.324 m) in Gardner, Massachusetts. Across the region, approximately 8,900 homes and buildings were destroyed and an additional 15,000 were damaged, leaving about 63,000 people homeless. Around 2 billion trees were destroyed. A total of 2,605 vessels were destroyed and 3,369 more were damaged. The estimate of people killed during the hurricane ranges from 494 to 700, with more than 1,700 individuals injured. Total damage was estimated at $620 million.

=== Tropical Storm Seven ===
- Tropical storm (SSHWS)
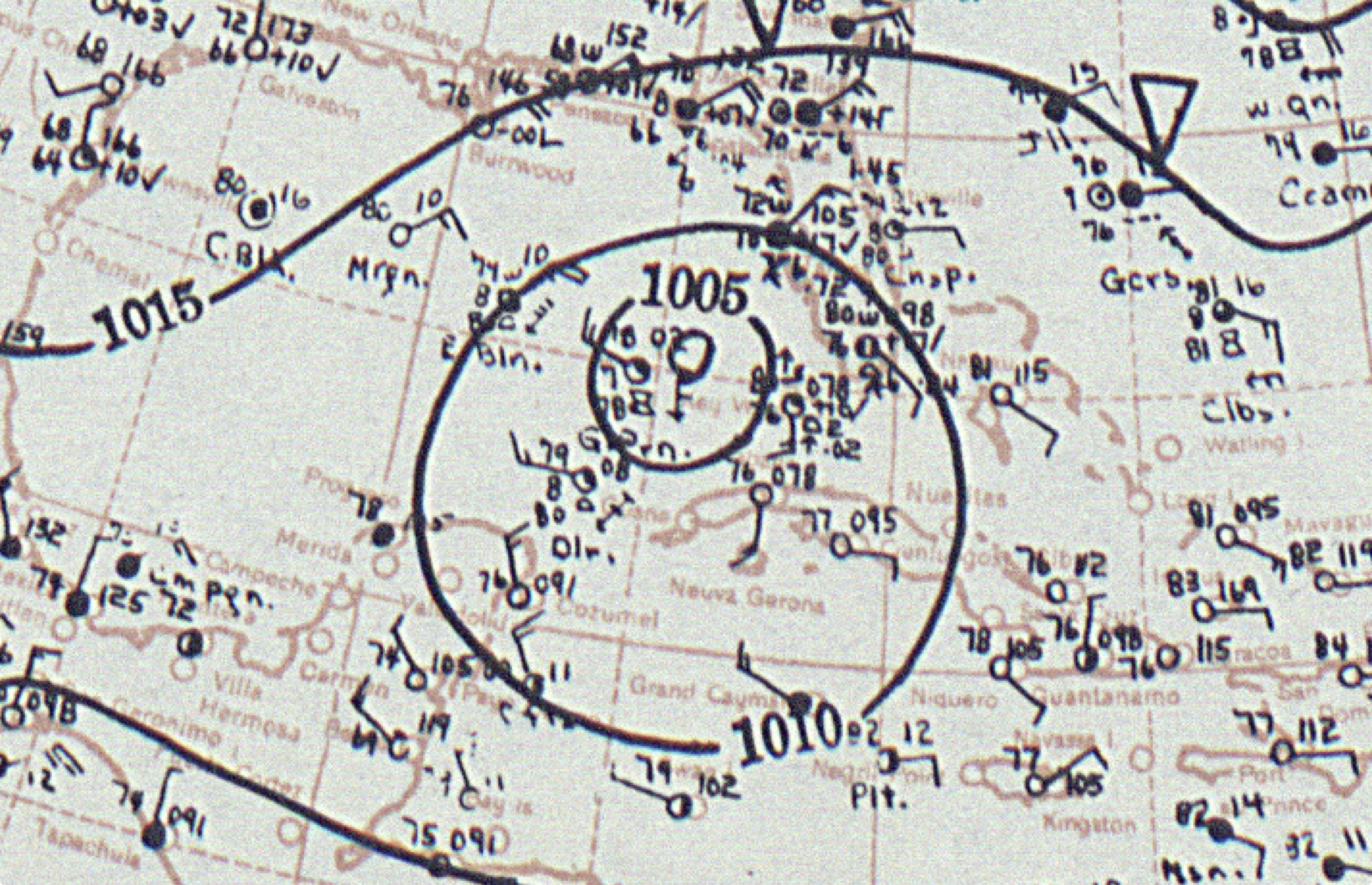
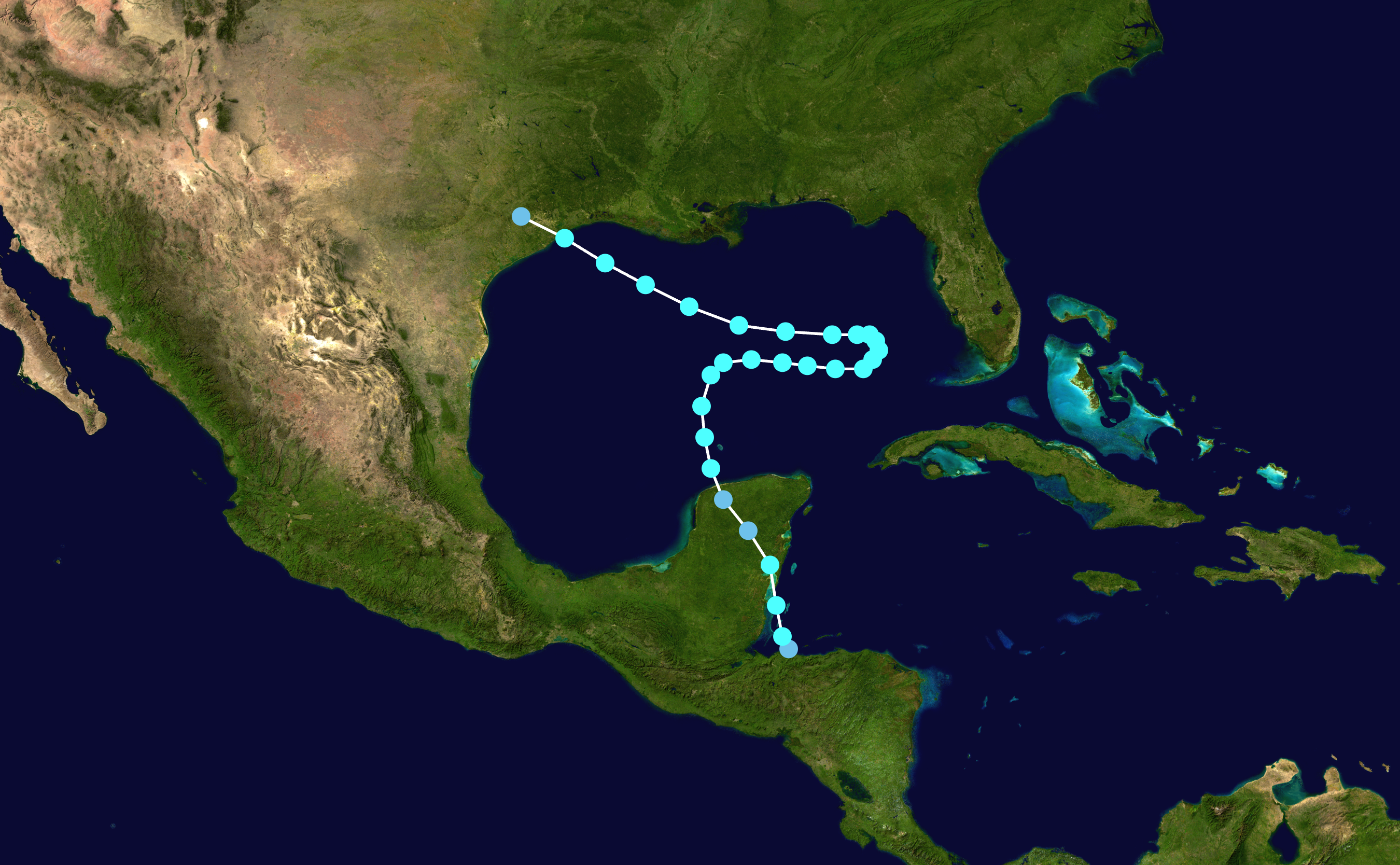
- Duration: October 10 – October 17
- Peak intensity: 60 mph (95 km/h) (1-min); 996 mbar (hPa)

A tropical depression formed over the Gulf of Honduras around 18:00 UTC on October 10 and quickly intensified into a tropical storm six hours later. The system moved northwest and struck San Pedro Town, Belize, with winds of 45 mph (72 km/h) at 08:00 UTC on October 11. It weakened to a tropical depression while moving across the Yucatán Peninsula but regained tropical storm intensity and reached peak winds of 60 mph (97 km/h) after emerging into the Gulf of Mexico. The cyclone turned east toward the Florida Keys but began backtracking on October 15, embarking on a west-northwest trajectory that brought it ashore Galveston Island, Texas, around 13:00 UTC on October 17. It maintained winds of 45 mph (72 km/h) at the time. Once inland, the storm continued west-northwest and was last analyzed northwest of Houston at 18:00 UTC.

The tropical storm produced brisk winds across coastal sections of Florida, downing trees, signs, and power lines in the St. Petersburg area. Heavy rains flooded streets and stalled out several vehicles. In Texas, the storm produced peak winds of 43 mph (69 km/h) at Fort Crockett. Squalls and elevated tides affected the coastline. Rainfall throughout the region proved to be beneficial against a prolonged dry spell.

=== Tropical Storm Eight ===
- Tropical storm (SSHWS)
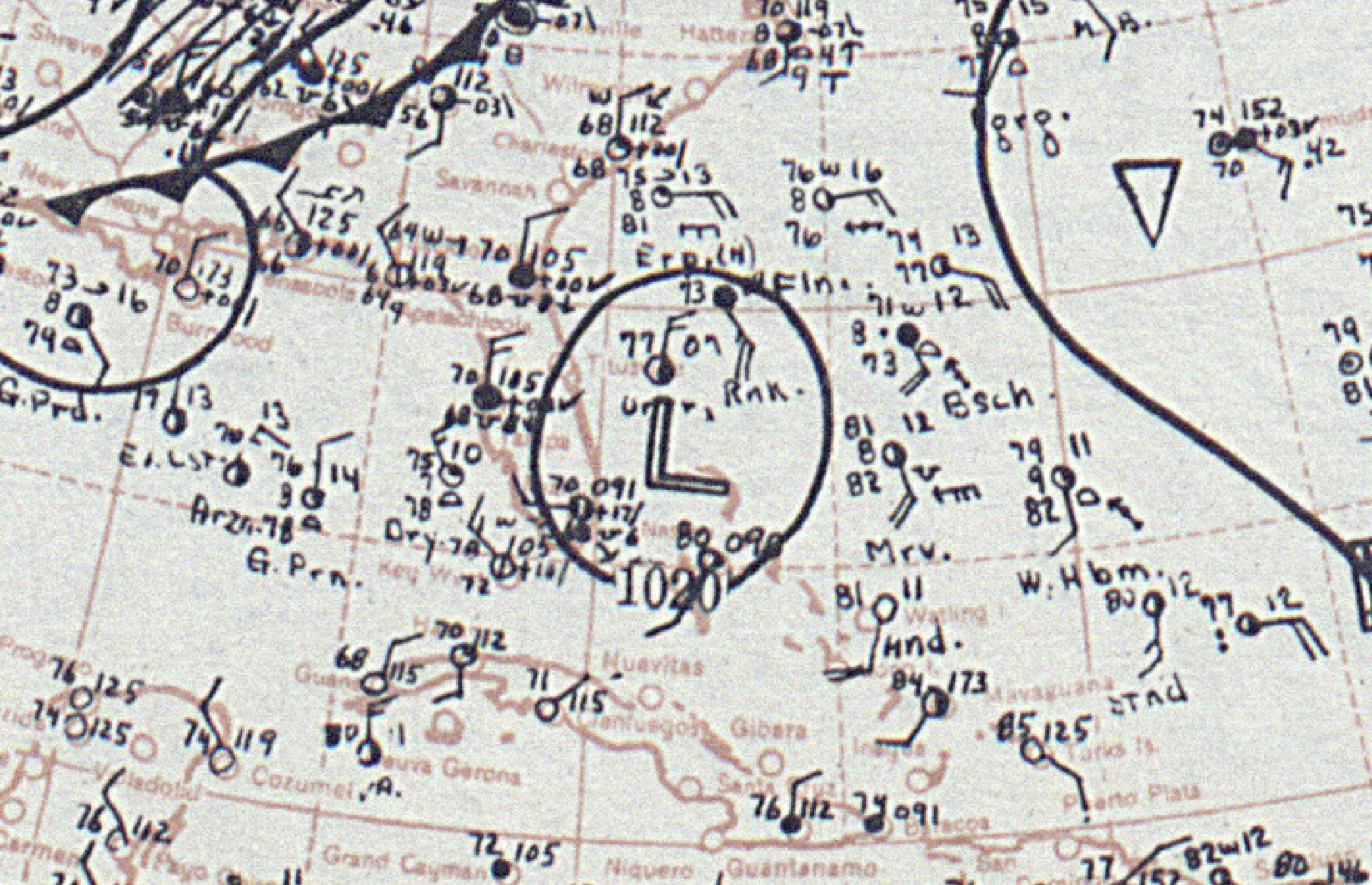
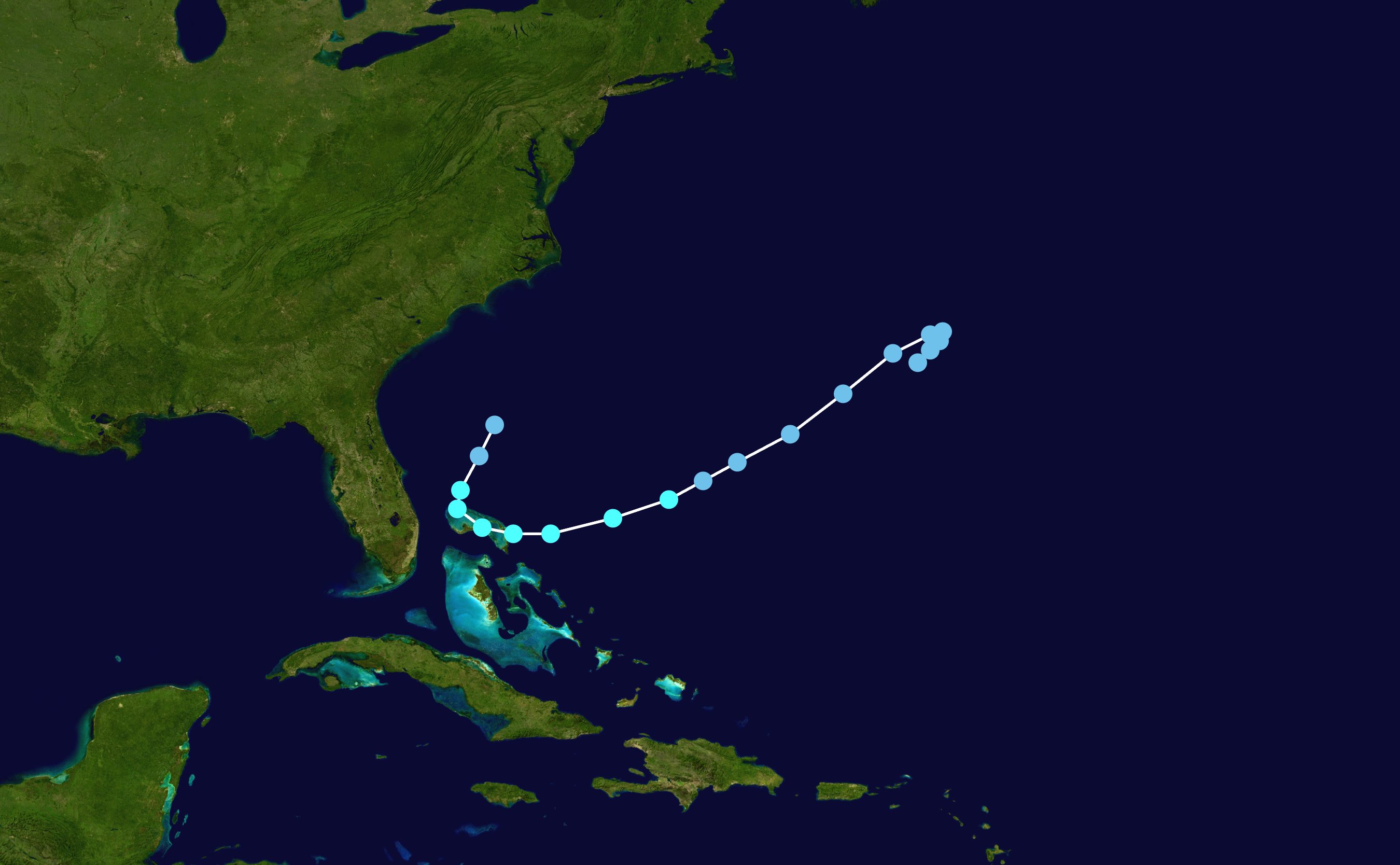
- Duration: October 16 – October 21
- Peak intensity: 40 mph (65 km/h) (1-min); 1004 mbar (hPa)

A trough in the vicinity of Bermuda organized into a tropical depression around 12:00 UTC on October 16. The cyclone failed to intensify for a few days as it meandered and then moved southwest. Finally, by 00:00 UTC on October 19, the depression intensified into a tropical or subtropical storm and attained peak winds of 40 mph (64 km/h) to the north of the Turks and Caicos Islands. It moved across Little Abaco Island and Grand Bahama before turning north-northeast. An approaching cold front imparted wind shear on the storm, and the system dissipated after 00:00 UTC on October 21 as it was overtaken by a non-tropical low east of the northern Florida coastline.

The extratropical remnants continued toward Nova Scotia, where impacts were considered the worst since February 1932. Ferry services were cancelled, barns were collapsed in Antigonish, and a house was shifted off its foundation in New Waterford. Two schooners were badly damaged. In nearby Newfoundland, four people drowned after being washed overboard. Damage to a breakwater at Sandy Point was estimated between $5,000–7,000, where two vessels also went aground. Across the island, telegraph lines were downed and roads were damaged.

=== Tropical Storm Nine ===
- Tropical storm (SSHWS)
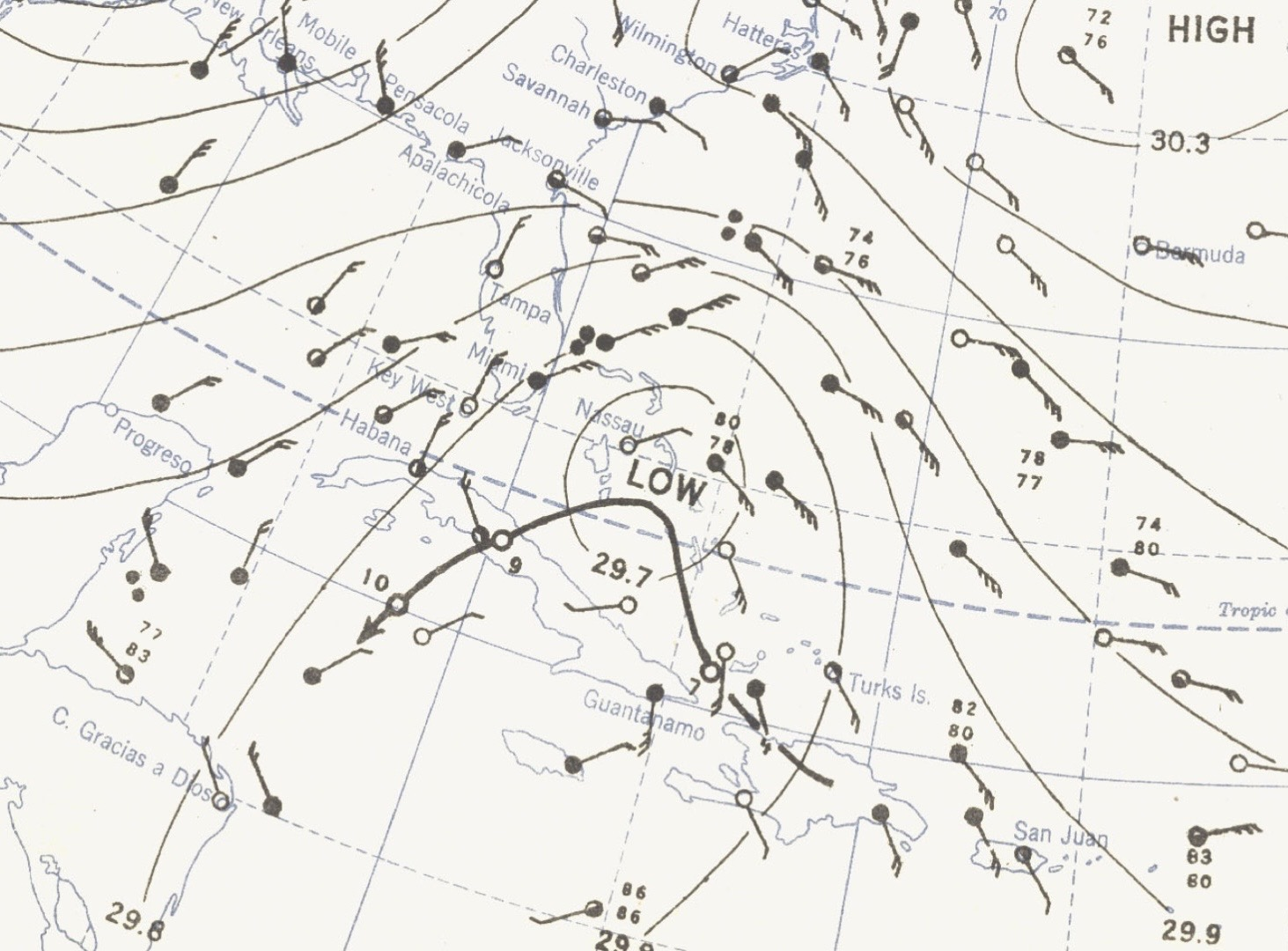
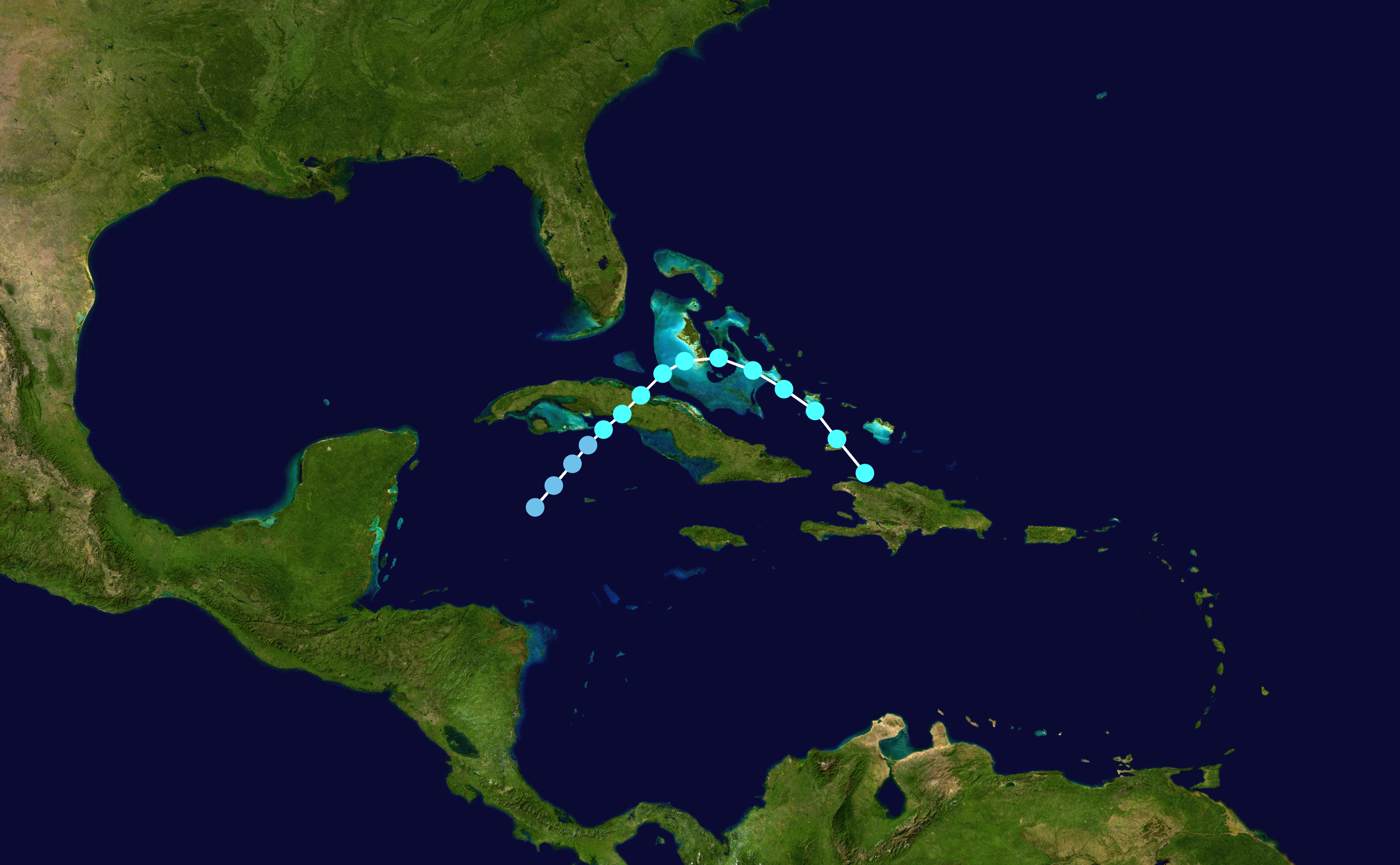
- Duration: November 6 – November 10
- Peak intensity: 70 mph (110 km/h) (1-min); ≤1000 mbar (hPa)

The final cyclone of the 1938 season developed by 06:00 UTC on November 7 off the northern coast of Haiti. In its early stages, the system exhibited a broad radius of maximum winds and was in close proximity to a stationary front, suggesting it was a subtropical storm for most of its duration. High pressure to the north directed the cyclone northwest, and it made landfall on Inagua in the Bahamas with winds of 70 mph (115 km/h) at 11:00 UTC on November 7; these winds were located well north of the center. It made a second landfall eight hours later on Crooked Island at an unchanged strength. The storm began to weaken early on November 8 and curved southwestward later that day, bringing it ashore the central coastline of Cuba with winds of 50 mph (80 km/h) around 06:00 UTC on November 9. The system continued into the northwestern Caribbean Sea, where it merged with a former frontal boundary and dissipated after 18:00 UTC on November 10.

San Salvador Island and Antilla, Cuba, both recorded maximum winds of 49 mph (79 km/h) on November 7 and November 9, respectively. Strong winds in heavy squalls south of the storm's center caused damage to telephone lines in the vicinity of Baracoa, Cuba. Winds just shy of tropical storm force impacted the Florida Keys and the state's mainland, and those winds were compounded by wave erosion that caused an estimated $75,000–100,000 in damage on Anastasia Island. The effects of the storm and a subsequent nor'easter necessitated the repair and extension of jetties at the mouth of the St. Johns River.

=== Other systems ===
In addition to the systems which at least attained tropical storm intensity in 1938, the Atlantic hurricane reanalysis project also identified six tropical depressions. Due to their weak intensities, however, they were not added to the official database. The first was identified around 00:00 UTC on June 2 to the south of Bermuda. It moved north-northeast very near the island before degenerating to a trough. The second tropical depression may have formed south of Jamaica as soon as August 8. It moved west-northwest for a few days and was absorbed by Hurricane Three around 00:00 UTC on August 12. There is no conclusive evidence that a closed circulation existed after August 10, however. Eight days later, a possible tropical storm was identified over the central Atlantic as nearby ships recorded gale-force winds. Despite this, only three observations showed westerly winds south of the center, and this evidence was insufficient to support more than a tropical depression. The system dissipated on August 21.

On August 28, an area of low pressure formed along a front off the coastline of North Carolina. It transitioned into a tropical depression on August 29–30 as the frontal feature dissipated but once again acquired extratropical characteristics as another front approached the center. The low moved east and dissipated or was absorbed on September 4. In early September, a tropical wave crossed Florida into the Gulf of Mexico, organizing into a tropical depression on September 10 and striking the Texas coastline around 00:00 UTC the next day. It dissipated on September 12. Around that same time, an area of low pressure was identified in the Bay of Campeche. Enhanced winds in Veracruz city suggest a small tropical depression may have existed in the region around September 9–10. It dissipated the next day. On September 11, a stationary front was identified south of Bermuda. This boundary dissipated and gave way to a tropical depression on September 12–14. The next day, it was absorbed into another front. On October 10, an area of disturbed weather existed in the vicinity of the United States Virgin Islands. Cyclonic flow existed on the northern side of this feature, but only one ship recorded westerly winds south of the center, and the data from that ship is questioned. A tropical depression may have existed from October 11–12 before it dissipated the next day.

The Atlantic hurricane database originally recognized a brief tropical cyclone in the Gulf of Mexico on October 23–24. However, surface observations indicate that the low was attached to a warm front, with cold temperatures along the U.S. Gulf Coast. The extratropical low struck the Big Bend of Florida on October 24 and progressed northeast. It merged with another extratropical low north of Nova Scotia on October 25.

== Season effects ==
The table below includes the duration, names, landfall(s), denoted in parentheses, damage, and death totals of all tropical cyclones in the 1938 Atlantic hurricane season. Deaths in parentheses are additional and indirect (an example of an indirect death would be a traffic accident), but were still related to that storm. Damage and deaths include totals while the storm was extratropical, a wave, or a low.

Saffir–Simpson scale
TD	TS	C1	C2	C3	C4	C5

1938 North Atlantic tropical cyclones season statistics
Storm name	Dates active	Storm category at peak intensity	Max 1-min wind mph (km/h)	Min. press. (mbar)	Areas affected	Damage (US$)	Deaths	Ref(s).
One	January 3–6	Category 1 hurricane	80 (130)	992	None	None	None	
Two	August 8–9	Tropical storm	70 (110)	1002	Greater Antilles	None	None	
Three	August 10–15	Category 2 hurricane	100 (160)	995	Jamaica, Grand Cayman, Texas, Louisiana	$245,550	None	
Four	August 23–29	Category 3 hurricane	120 (195)	964	Yucatán Peninsula, Northern Mexico, Texas, New Mexico	Unknown	14	
Five	September 9–14	Tropical storm	40 (65)	1009	None	None	None	
Six	September 9–21	Category 5 hurricane	160 (260)	940	New England	$620 million	494–700	
Seven	October 10–17	Tropical storm	60 (95)	996	Texas, Louisiana	Minimal	None	
Eight	October 16–21	Tropical storm	40 (65)	1004	The Bahamas, Nova Scotia, Newfoundland	$5,000–7,000	4	
Nine	November 6–10	Tropical storm	70 (110)	1000	The Bahamas, Cuba, Florida	$100,000	None	
Season aggregates
9 systems	January 3 – November 10		160 (260)	940		>$620.4 million	>512	

== See also ==
- 1938 Pacific hurricane season
- 1938 Pacific typhoon season
- 1900–1950 South-West Indian Ocean cyclone seasons
- 1930s Australian region cyclone seasons
