= 1938 Pacific hurricane season =

Seasonal boundaries
- First system formed: January 11, 1938
- Last system dissipated: October 22, 1938

Strongest storm
- Name: Five
  - Lowest pressure: 976 mbar (hPa; 28.82 inHg)

Seasonal statistics
- Total storms: 18
- Hurricanes: 1
- Total fatalities: 5
- Total damage: Unknown

Related articles
- 1938 Atlantic hurricane season; 1938 Pacific typhoon season; 1930s North Indian Ocean cyclone seasons

The 1938 Pacific hurricane season ran through the summer and fall of 1938. Before the satellite age started in the 1960s, data on east Pacific hurricanes was extremely unreliable. Most east Pacific storms were of no threat to land. However, 1938 saw an unusually active season, with numerous tropical cyclones forming in January and a hurricane struck Northern California in February, killing five people. On August 18, Cyclone Mokapu caused record August rainfall, and a record low pressure when it struck Hawaiian Islands. It brought down power lines and damages into a plantation.

== Systems ==
=== Tropical Cyclone One and Two ===
Two tropical cyclones existed in January, one near the International dateline and another near the Revillagigedo Islands.

=== Hurricane Three ===
A hurricane hit Northern California in early to mid-February, killing five.

=== Possible Tropical Storm Four ===
A tropical storm possibly existed in the Gulf of Tehuantepec on June 2.

=== Tropical Cyclone Five ===
On June 15, a tropical cyclone was observed. It was moving northwestward. A pressure reading of 28.84 inHg (97.7 kPa) was reported in association with this tropical cyclone.

=== Tropical Cyclone Six ===
On June 20, a tropical cyclone was observed west of Manzanillo. Two days later, it was observed again south of the entrance to the Gulf of California. The tropical cyclone was not observed after June 22. The lowest pressure reported by a ship was 29.59 inHg (100.2 kPa).

=== Tropical Cyclone Seven ===
Southeast of Acapulco, a tropical cyclone existed on June 25. It was moving northwestward, and its lowest reported pressure was 29.14 inHg (98.7 kPa).

=== Tropical Cyclone Eight ===
On July 28, a tropical cyclone caused gales in the Gulf of Tehuantepec.

=== Tropical Cyclone Nine ===
A tropical cyclone existed on August 1. It moved west, and was last detected on August 2. The lowest pressure reading was of 29.68 inHg (100.5 kPa).

=== Tropical Cyclone Ten ===
A tropical storm was detected on August 4. It was moving westwards. A ship recorded a pressure of 29.82 inHg (101.0 kPa).

=== Tropical Depression Eleven ===
On August 18, a tropical depression formed close to the Revillagigedo Islands. By the next day, it had moved to a location west-southwest or west of Cabo San Lucas. A ship reported a pressure reading of 29.50 inHg (99.9 kPa). The cyclone dissipated by late August 19.

=== Cyclone Mokapu ===
On August 18 and 19, a severe storm struck the Hawaiian Islands. It caused gales, broke August rainfall records, and a record low pressure of 29.77 inHg (100.8 kPa). The storm also downed power lines and damaged crops and trees at a plantation. The Central Pacific Hurricane Center calls this event the "Mokapu Cyclone" and speculates that it might have been caused by a tropical cyclone.

=== Possible Tropical Depression Thirteen ===
On September 1, a possible tropical depression formed south of Cape Corrientes. Without strengthening, it moved into the Gulf of California, from which it made landfall on September 3.

=== Tropical Cyclone Fourteen ===
In the Gulf of Tehuantepec, a tropical cyclone formed on September 4. It moved along the coast of Mexico, staying offshore, and dissipated on September 13 while off the west coast of the Baja California. The lowest pressure reported by a ship was 29.31 inHg (99.3 kPa).

=== Tropical Cyclone Fifteen ===
A short-lived tropical cyclone existed between Salina Cruz and Acapulco on September 11. Ships reported gales and a pressure of 29.65 inHg (100.4 kPa).

=== Possible Tropical Cyclone Sixteen ===
On September 24 and 25, a ship encountered stormy weather and gales. These were probably caused by a tropical cyclone located west of the Revillagigedo Islands.

=== Tropical Cyclone Seventeen ===
On October 9, a ship encountered a tropical cyclone. It reported gales, and recorded a pressure of 29.43 inHg (99.7 kPa).

=== Tropical Cyclone Eighteen ===
On October 22, a tropical cyclone existed. It had gales, and a ship measured a central pressure of 29.31 inHg (99.3 kPa).

== See also ==
- 1938 Atlantic hurricane season
- 1938 Pacific typhoon season
- 1930s North Indian Ocean cyclone seasons
- 1900–1940 South Pacific cyclone seasons
- 1900–1950 South-West Indian Ocean cyclone seasons
- 1930s Australian region cyclone seasons
