= 1938 Pacific typhoon season =

Seasonal boundaries
- First system formed: January 11, 1938
- Last system dissipated: December 10, 1938

Seasonal statistics
- Total depressions: 31
- Total fatalities: 338
- Total damage: Unknown

Related articles
- 1938 Atlantic hurricane season; 1938 Pacific hurricane season; 1930s North Indian Ocean cyclone seasons

The 1938 Pacific typhoon season featured 31 storms. Data from this period was extremely sparse, so intensity is not available for these systems. The only agency that tracked these typhoons is the International Best Track Archive for Climate Stewardship (IBTrACS), which has compiled a database of all known tropical cyclones since 1851.

== Systems ==
=== January–May ===
The first storm of the season formed on January 11, west of the Philippines. It moved northwestward, and made landfall on Luzon late on January 12 before dissipating the next day. It caused no known deaths or damage.

IBTRACS gives a storm of unknown intensity, from April 5 to April 12. It did not affect land.

IBTRACS gives a storm of unknown intensity, from April 29 to May 4. It affected the Philippines, and neared China.

IBTRACS gives a storm of unknown intensity, from May 9 to May 16. It affected the Philippines.

=== June and July ===
IBTRACS gives a storm of unknown intensity, from June 21 to July 3. It affected Japan.

IBTRACS gives a storm of unknown intensity, from July 7 to July 10. It affected China.

IBTRACS gives a storm of unknown intensity, from July 15 to July 19. It did not affect land.

=== Storm Eight ===
- Duration: July 18 – July 19
- Peak intensity: Winds not specified;

IBTRACS gives a storm of unknown intensity in July. It did not affect land.

=== Storm Nine ===
- Duration: August 4 – August 13
- Peak intensity: Winds not specified;

IBTRACS gives a storm of unknown intensity in August. It affected Japan and China.

=== Storm Ten ===
- Duration: August 5 – August 8
- Peak intensity: Winds not specified;

IBTRACS gives a storm of unknown intensity in August. It did not affect land.

=== Storm Eleven ===
- Duration: August 11 – August 16
- Peak intensity: Winds not specified;

IBTRACS gives a storm of unknown intensity in August. It did not affect land.

=== Storm Twelve ===
- Duration: August 20 – August 23
- Peak intensity: Winds not specified;

IBTRACS gives a storm of unknown intensity in August. It affected Taiwan.

=== Storm Thirteen ===
- Duration: August 23 – August 26
- Peak intensity: Winds not specified;

IBTRACS gives a storm of unknown intensity in August. It did not affect land.

=== Storm Fourteen ===
- Duration: August 24 – August 27
- Peak intensity: Winds not specified;

IBTRACS gives a storm of unknown intensity in August. It affected China.

=== Storm Fifteen ===
- Duration: August 25 – September 2
- Peak intensity: Winds not specified;

IBTRACS gives a storm of unknown intensity in August and September. It affected Japan.

=== Storm Sixteen ===
- Duration: August 30 – September 9
- Peak intensity: Winds not specified;

IBTRACS gives a storm of unknown intensity in August and September. It affected Japan.

=== Storm Seventeen ===
- Duration: September 1 – September 4
- Peak intensity: Winds not specified;

IBTRACS gives a storm of unknown intensity in September. It did not affect land.

=== Storm Eighteen ===
- Duration: September 6 – September 9
- Peak intensity: Winds not specified;

IBTRACS gives a storm of unknown intensity in September. It did not affect land.

=== Storm Nineteen ===
- Duration: September 17 – September 26
- Peak intensity: Winds not specified;

IBTRACS gives a storm of unknown intensity in September. It neared Japan.

=== Storm Twenty ===
- Duration: September 23 – September 28
- Peak intensity: Winds not specified;

IBTRACS gives a storm of unknown intensity in September. It affected Taiwan and China.

=== Storm Twenty-One ===
- Duration: September 25 – September 28
- Peak intensity: Winds not specified;

IBTRACS gives a storm of unknown intensity in September. It affected Vietnam.

=== Storm Twenty-Two ===
- Duration: September 27 – October 7
- Peak intensity: Winds not specified;

IBTRACS gives a storm of unknown intensity in September and October. It affected the Philippines.

=== Storm Twenty-Three ===
- Duration: October 1 – October 8
- Peak intensity: Winds not specified;

IBTRACS gives a storm of unknown intensity in October. It affected the Philippines and China, and caused a shipwreck in Luzon, killing 33 people.

=== Storm Twenty-Four ===
- Duration: October 6 – October 16
- Peak intensity: Winds not specified;

IBTRACS gives a storm of unknown intensity in October. It neared Japan.

=== Storm Twenty-Five ===
- Duration: October 10 – October 21
- Peak intensity: Winds not specified;

IBTRACS gives a storm of unknown intensity in October. It affected Japan.

=== Storm Twenty-Six ===
- Duration: October 13 – October 16
- Peak intensity: Winds not specified;

IBTRACS gives a storm of unknown intensity in October. It did not affect land.

=== Storm Twenty-Seven ===
- Duration: November 3 – November 10
- Peak intensity: Winds not specified;

IBTRACS gives a storm of unknown intensity in November. It affected the Philippines and China.

=== Storm Twenty-Eight ===
- Duration: November 10 – November 16
- Peak intensity: Winds not specified;

IBTRACS gives a storm of unknown intensity in November. It did not affect land.

=== Storm Twenty-Nine ===
- Duration: November 21 – November 27
- Peak intensity: Winds not specified;

IBTRACS gives a storm of unknown intensity in November. It affected the Philippines.

=== Storm Thirty ===
- Duration: November 28 – December 2
- Peak intensity: Winds not specified;

IBTRACS gives a storm of unknown intensity in November and December. It affected the Philippines.

=== Storm Thirty-One ===
- Duration: December 4 – December 10
- Peak intensity: Winds not specified;

IBTRACS gives a storm of unknown intensity in December. It affected the Philippines, killing 305 people.

== See also ==
- 1900–1950 South-West Indian Ocean cyclone seasons
- 1900–1940 South Pacific cyclone seasons
- 1930s Australian region cyclone seasons
