= Del Mar Heights, Texas =

- Census-designated place
- Coordinates: 26°4′0″N 97°25′24″W
- Country: United States
- State: Texas
- County: Cameron

Area
  - Total: 0.45 sq mi (1.17 km^{2})
  - Land: 0.45 sq mi (1.17 km^{2})
  - Water: 0 sq mi (0.0 km^{2})
- Elevation: 14 ft (4.3 m)

Population (2020)
  - Total: 78
  - Density: 170/sq mi (67/km^{2})
- Time zone: UTC-6 (Central (CST))
  - Summer (DST): UTC-5 (CDT)
- FIPS code: 48-19714
- GNIS feature ID: 1852697

Del Mar Heights is a census-designated place (CDP) in Cameron County, Texas, United States. The population was 78 at the 2020 census. It is part of the Brownsville–Harlingen Metropolitan Statistical Area.

== Geography ==
Del Mar Heights is located near the center of Cameron County, 16 miles (26 km) by road north of the center of Brownsville and 3 miles (5 km) east of Los Fresnos.

According to the United States Census Bureau, the CDP has a total area of 0.45 square miles (1.17 km^{2}), all land.

== Demographics ==
Historical population
Census	Pop.	Note	%±
2000	259		—
2010	113		−56.4%
2020	78		−31.0%
U.S. Decennial Census; 1850–1900 1910; 1920 1930 1940; 1950 1960 1970; 1980 1990 2000; 2010 2020

Del Mar Heights first appeared as a census designated place prior to the 2000 U.S. census.

=== 2020 census ===
Del Mar Heights CDP, Texas – Racial and ethnic composition Note: the US Census treats Hispanic/Latino as an ethnic category. This table excludes Latinos from the racial categories and assigns them to a separate category. Hispanics/Latinos may be of any race.
Race / Ethnicity (NH = Non-Hispanic)	Pop 2000	Pop 2010	Pop 2020	% 2000	% 2010	% 2020
White alone (NH)	8	4	3	3.09%	3.54%	3.85%
Black or African American alone (NH)	1	0	0	0.39%	0.00%	0.00%
Native American or Alaska Native alone (NH)	0	0	0	0.00%	0.00%	0.00%
Asian alone (NH)	0	0	0	0.00%	0.00%	0.00%
Native Hawaiian or Pacific Islander alone (NH)	0	0	0	0.00%	0.00%	0.00%
Other race alone (NH)	0	0	0	0.00%	0.00%	0.00%
Mixed race or Multiracial (NH)	0	0	0	0.00%	0.00%	0.00%
Hispanic or Latino (any race)	250	109	75	96.53%	96.46%	96.15%
Total	259	113	78	100.00%	100.00%	100.00%

As of the census of 2000, there were 259 people, 61 households, and 53 families residing in the CDP. The population density was 658.0 inhabitants per square mile (254.1/km^{2}). There were 81 housing units at an average density of 205.8 per square mile (79.5/km^{2}). The racial makeup of the CDP was 74.90% White, 3.09% African American, 20.46% from other races, and 1.54% from two or more races. Hispanic or Latino of any race were 96.53% of the population.

There were 61 households, out of which 63.9% had children under the age of 18 living with them, 59.0% were married couples living together, 27.9% had a female householder with no husband present, and 11.5% were non-families. 11.5% of all households were made up of individuals, and 4.9% had someone living alone who was 65 years of age or older. The average household size was 4.25 and the average family size was 4.63.

In the CDP, the population was spread out, with 45.6% under the age of 18, 10.4% from 18 to 24, 27.8% from 25 to 44, 10.0% from 45 to 64, and 6.2% who were 65 years of age or older. The median age was 20 years. For every 100 females, there were 107.2 males. For every 100 females age 18 and over, there were 90.5 males.

The median income for a household in the CDP was $13,229, and the median income for a family was $15,714. Males had a median income of $11,818 versus $0 for females. The per capita income for the CDP was $3,665. About 60.4% of families and 66.9% of the population were below the poverty line, including 81.2% of those under the age of 18 and none of those 65 or over.

== Education ==
Del Mar Heights is served by the Los Fresnos Consolidated Independent School District.

In addition, South Texas Independent School District operates magnet schools that serve the community.
