= 1987 Pacific typhoon season =

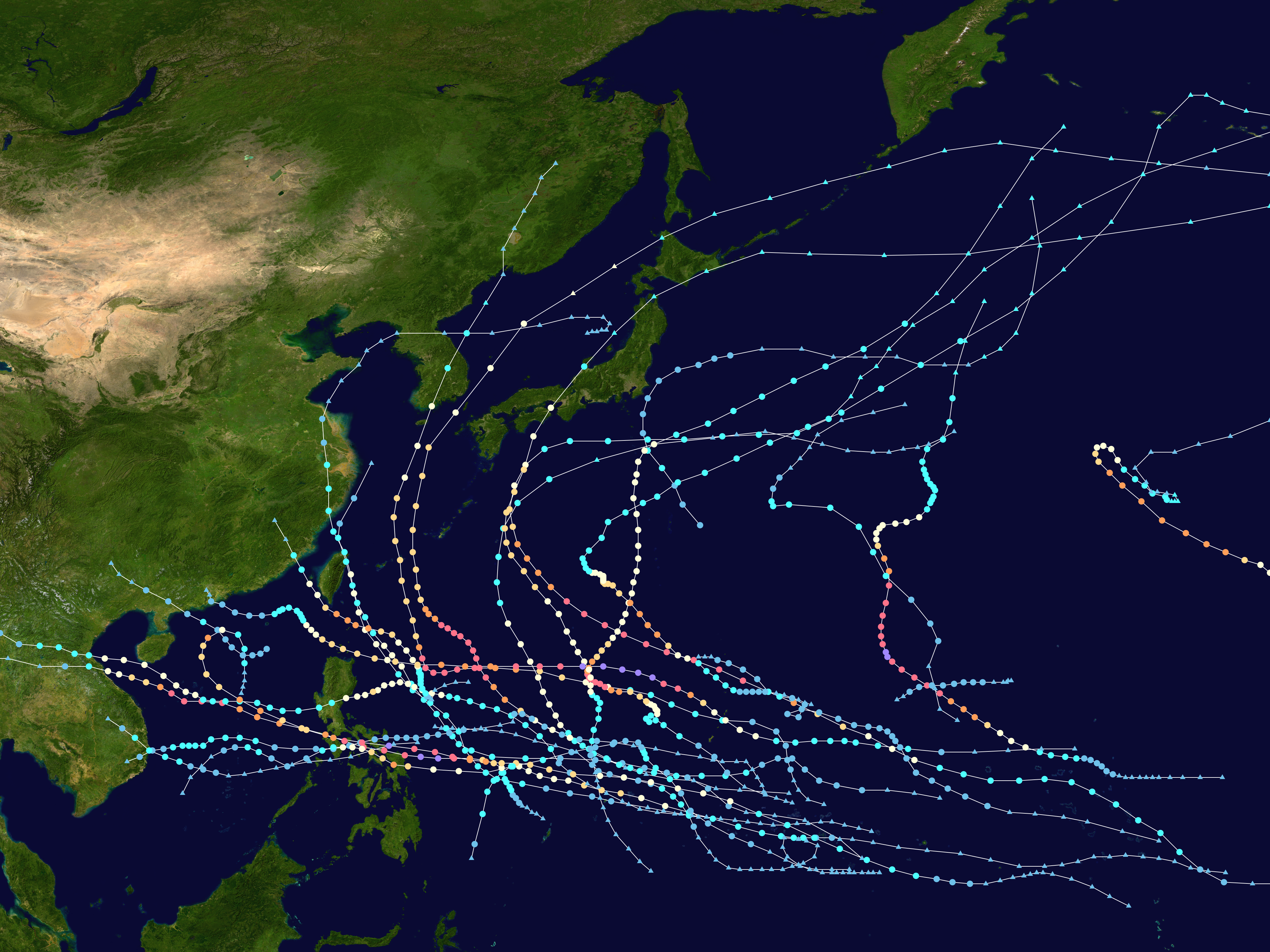
- Season summary map

Seasonal boundaries
- First system formed: January 7, 1987
- Last system dissipated: December 20, 1987

Strongest storm
- Name: Betty
  - Maximum winds: 205 km/h (125 mph) (10-minute sustained)
  - Lowest pressure: 890 hPa (mbar)

Seasonal statistics
- Total depressions: 32
- Total storms: 23
- Typhoons: 17
- Very strong typhoons: 9
- Violent typhoons: 5
- Total fatalities: 1,402 total
- Total damage: > $1.3 billion (1987 USD)

Related articles
- 1987 Atlantic hurricane season; 1987 Pacific hurricane season; 1987 North Indian Ocean cyclone season

The 1987 Pacific typhoon season was a below average season, though it featured a relatively high amount of typhoons. It had no official bounds; it ran year-round in 1987, but most tropical cyclones formed between June and November. Tropical storms that formed in the entire basin were assigned a name by the Joint Typhoon Warning Center. Tropical depressions that enter or form in the Philippine area of responsibility are assigned a name by the Philippine Atmospheric, Geophysical and Astronomical Services Administration or PAGASA. This can often result in the same storm having two names.

A total of 25 tropical cyclones formed this year in the Western Pacific, of which 24 became tropical storms. Of the 24, 17 storms reached typhoon intensity, of which 6 reached super typhoon strength.

== Seasonal summary ==
A total of 25 tropical cyclones formed this year in the Western Pacific, of which 24 became tropical storms. Of the 24, 17 storms reached typhoon intensity, of which 6 reached super typhoon strength.

== Systems ==
=== Typhoon Orchid (Auring) ===
- Very strong typhoon (JMA)
- Category 2 typhoon (SSHWS)
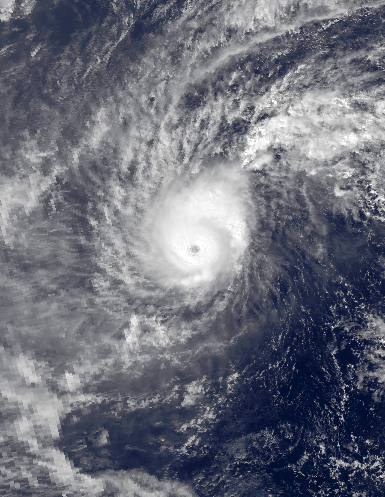
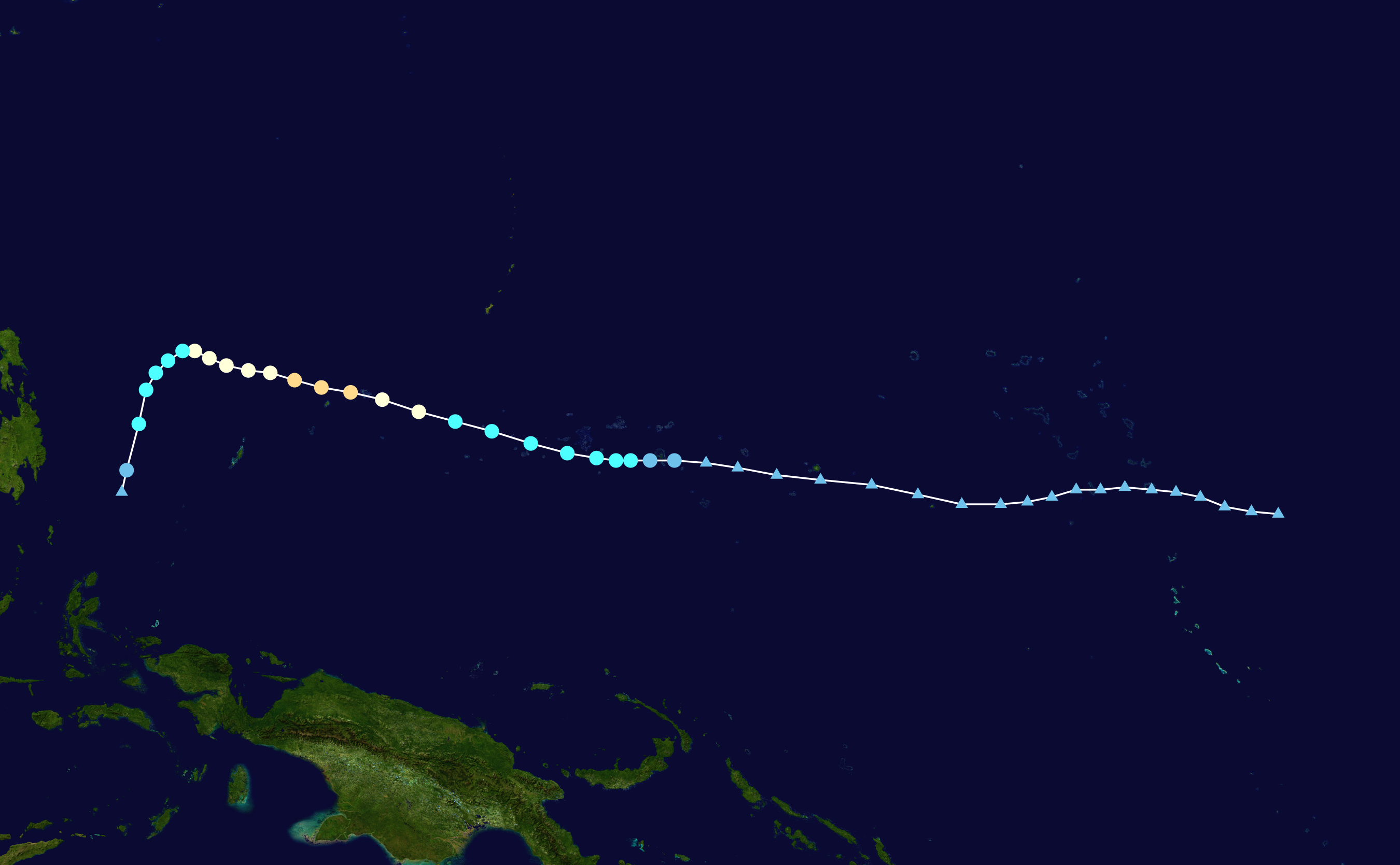
- Duration: January 7 – January 14
- Peak intensity: 165 km/h (105 mph) (10-min); 955 hPa (mbar)

On January 3, a small and persistent area of thunderstorms near the International Date Line was first detected. During the next few days, it slowly increased in organization and thunderstorm activity after which a small and ragged central dense overcast formed and upper-level outflow improved. A Tropical Cyclone Formation Alert (TCFA) was issued late on January 7 for the disturbance. The JTWC then issued their first warning on Tropical Depression 01W during the afternoon of January 7. The next morning, on January 8, an aircraft reconnaissance mission reported tropical storm–winds and the depression was upgraded to a tropical storm and named Orchid. Orchid continued to gradually strengthen until it reached its peak intensity of 110 mph (180 km/h) on January 11 as a small typhoon. After reaching peak intensity, Orchid weakened rather quickly and by January 14, it had degenerated into an area of low pressure.

Orchid caused "extensive damage" on Ulithi Atoll but no deaths were reported. In the wake of the typhoon, the United States Federal Emergency Management Agency declared parts of the Federated States of Micronesia as a disaster area.

=== Tropical Storm Percy ===
- Tropical storm (JMA)
- Tropical storm (SSHWS)
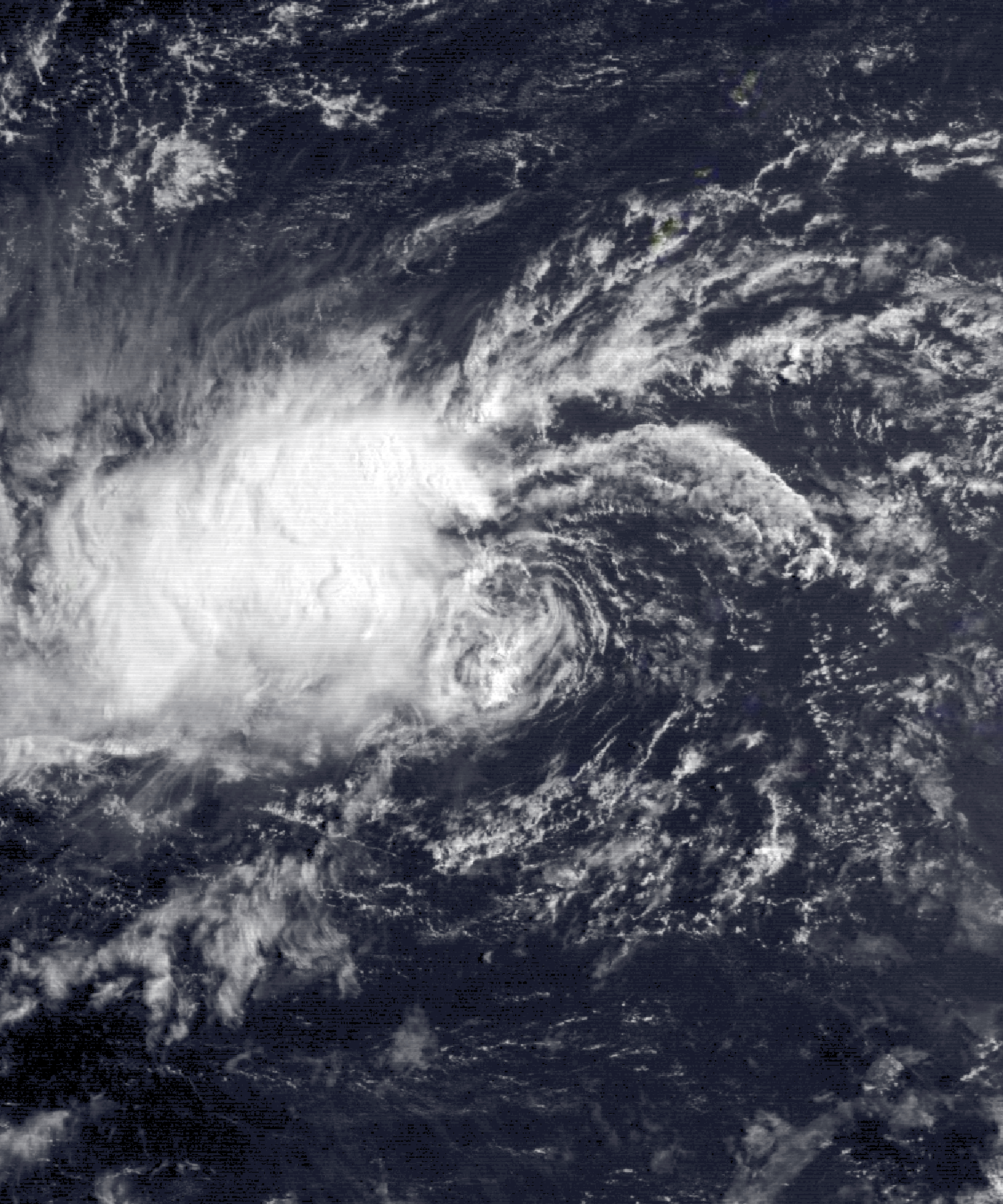
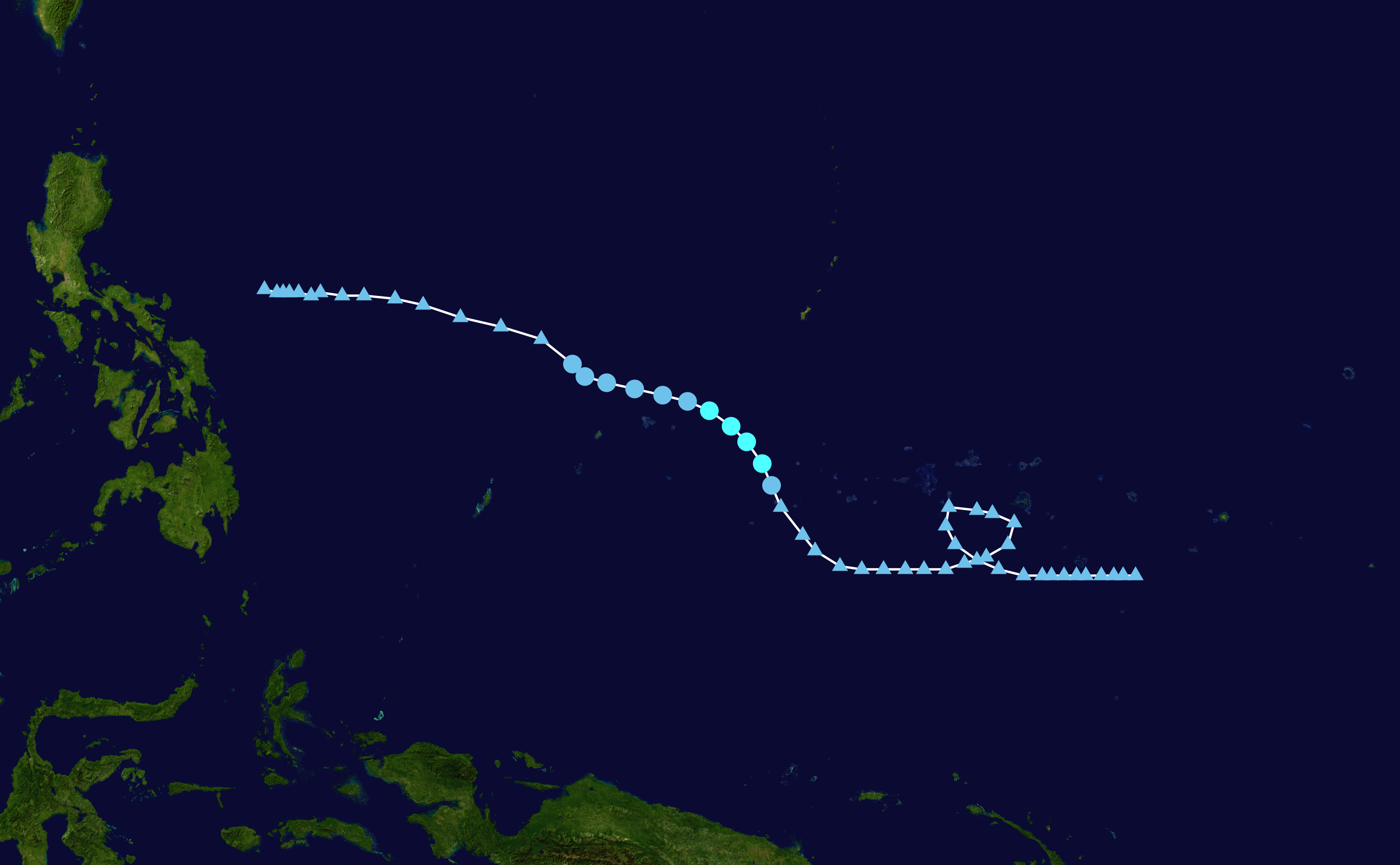
- Duration: April 9 – April 16
- Peak intensity: 85 km/h (50 mph) (10-min); 1000 hPa (mbar)

During the first week of April, the typical northeasterly trades clashed with a Southern Hemisphere Westerly wind burst, creating an area of low pressure near the Caroline Islands. Gradual development occurred as it tracked westward, and on April 9, the JMA upgraded the system into a tropical depression, although the JTWC did not follow suit until April 11. Following data from a hurricane hunter aircraft that indicated that the depression was much stronger than expected, both the JTWC and JMA upgraded the depression later on April 11, with the latter estimating a peak wind speed of 85 km/h (55 mph). Almost immediately thereafter, Percy weakened rapidly, with the storm's center becoming exposed from the deep convection. The JMA downgraded Percy into a tropical depression at 18:00 on April 11. Thirty hours later, the JTWC discontinued warnings. The JMA ceased tracking the storm while it was located near the northern tip of Luzon on April 16.

=== Tropical Storm Ruth ===
- Tropical storm (JMA)
- Tropical storm (SSHWS)
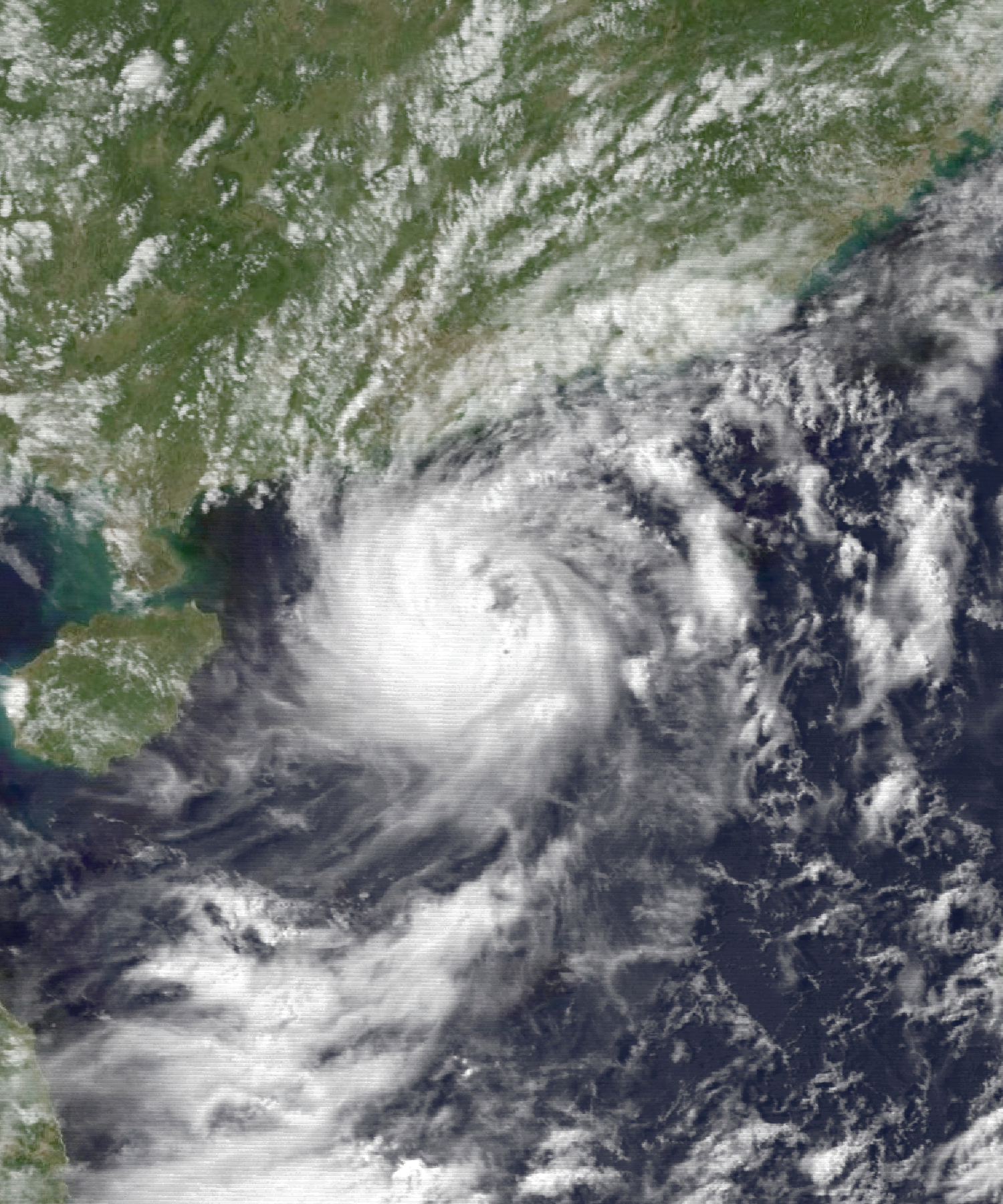
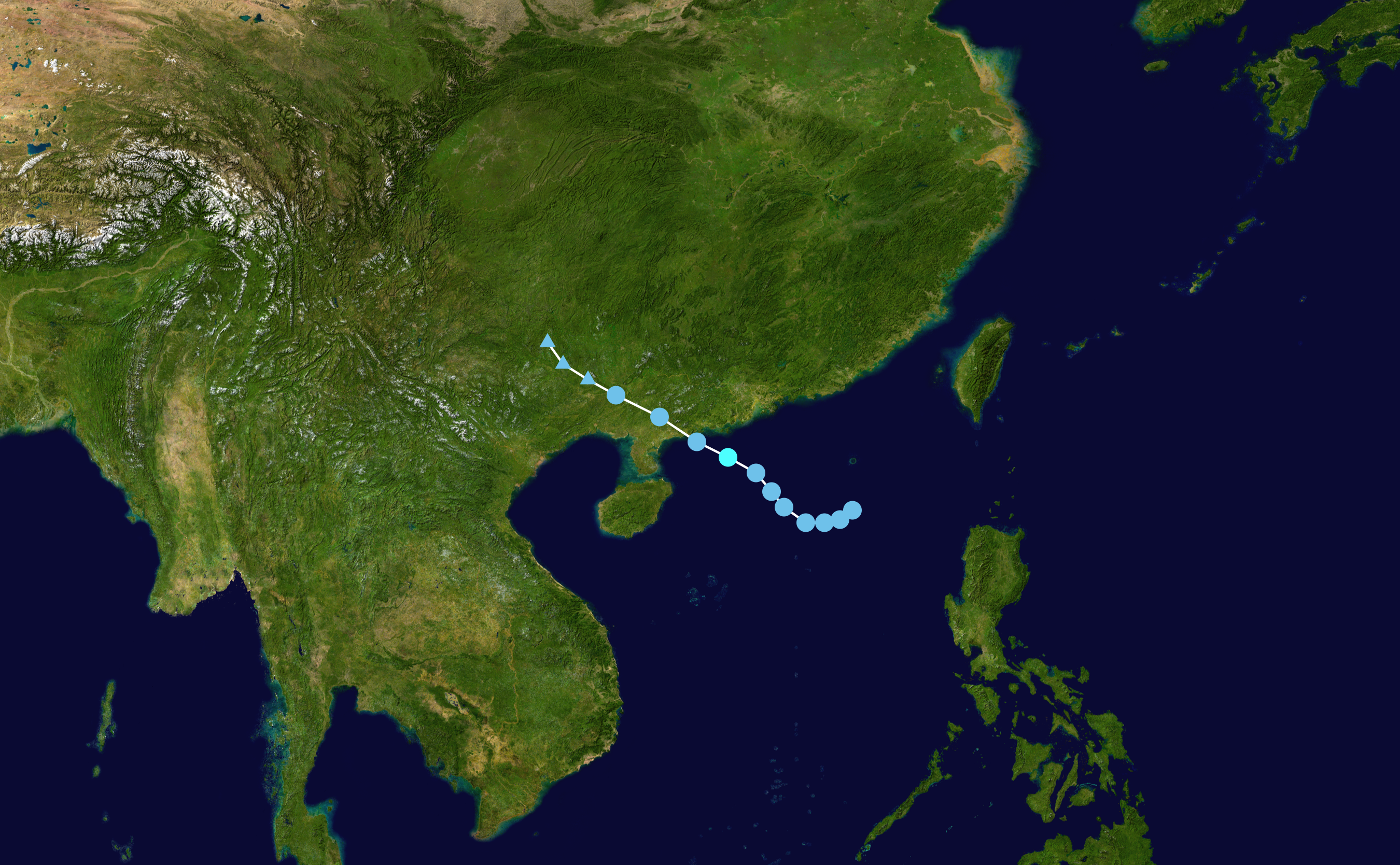
- Duration: June 17 – June 19
- Peak intensity: 85 km/h (50 mph) (10-min); 992 hPa (mbar)

According to the JMA, a tropical depression developed on June 17 around 445 km (275 mi) southeast of Hong Kong, becoming the first tropical cyclone of the season to develop in the South China Sea. Its convective structure gradually improved as the depression tracked west-northwest under the influence of a ridge to its north, and at 00:00 UTC on June 18, the JTWC classified the system as a tropical depression. The JMA upgraded the depression into a tropical storm six hours later, while also estimating a peak wind speed of 85 km/h (55 mph). The JTWC did not follow suit until at 18:00 UTC on June 18, when satellite estimated supported tropical storm intensity. Early on June 19, both the JTWC and JMA downgraded Ruth into a depression while it interacted with the southern China coast. Ruth dissipated inland later that day.

According to media outlets, Ruth inflicted widespread damage and casualties in southwest Guangdong and southeast Guangxi. In Guangdong, about 113,000 ha (279,230 acres) of farmland were inundated and 63,000 ha (155,675 acres) of banana plantations were damaged or destroyed. Extensive irrigation works were also damaged and 17 cows were killed. There, seven people were dead and eighty-six others were injured. Over 45,000 houses collapsed while more than 210,000 dwellings were damaged. Approximately 350 bridges were destroyed. In Guangxi, three deaths and twenty-six injuries were reported. As a result of the heavy rain, 45 bridges and over 780 houses sustained damaged. In addition, over 7,000 ha (17,295 acres) of farmland were flooded. The railway service was also temporarily disrupted. In Hong Kong, damage was minimal and only one structure was demolished.

=== Typhoon Sperry (Bebeng) ===
- Typhoon (JMA)
- Category 1 typhoon (SSHWS)
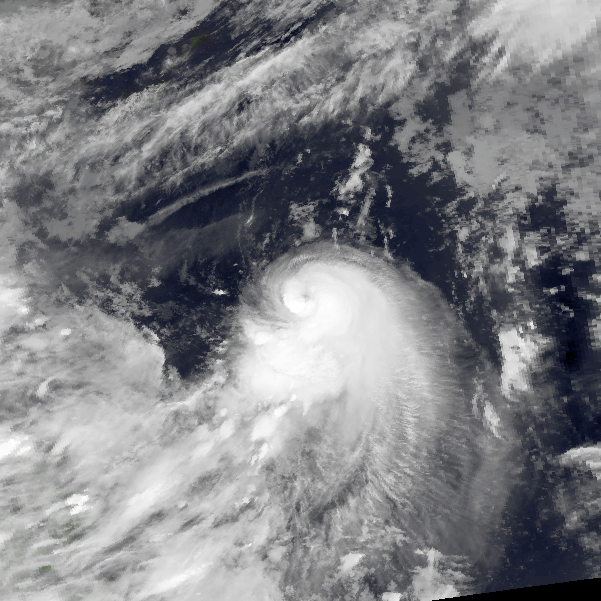
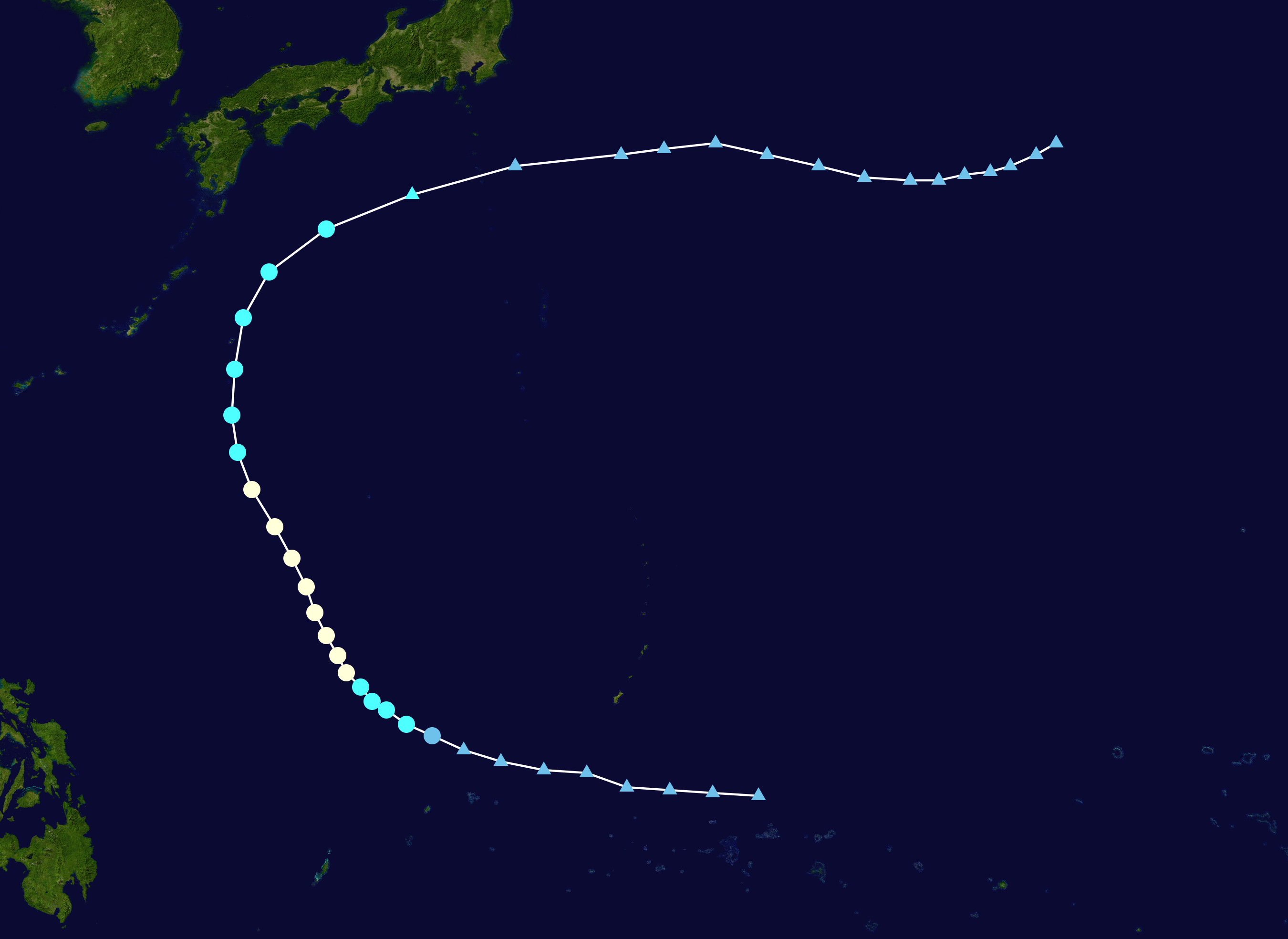
- Duration: June 26 – July 1
- Peak intensity: 120 km/h (75 mph) (10-min); 980 hPa (mbar)

The origins of Typhoon Sperry can be traced back to a weak surface circulation that formed on June 24 as part of the monsoon trough 370 km (230 mi) northwest of Truk. A second area of disturbed weather subsequently developed 400 km (250 mi) east of the Marshall Islands. The two areas consolidated into one on June 25, even though further development was initially slow to occur due to strong wind shear created by a tropical upper tropospheric trough near Wake Island. On June 25, the storm began to show signs of organization while tracking northwest; however, the JMA did not upgrade the system into a tropical depression until 00:00 UTC on June 26. On the next day, both the JTWC and JMA classified the system as Tropical Storm Sperry after the low-level center became better defined and the storm developed a central dense overcast – a large mass of deep convection. Later on June 28, Sperry was upgraded into a severe tropical storm by the JMA. On the next day, both agencies upgraded Sperry into a typhoon, the second of the season, based on reports from hurricane hunters. At noon on June 28, the JTWC and JMA reported that Sperry peaked in strength; the agencies estimated winds of 135 and 120 km/h (85 and 75 mph) respectively at this time. By June 29, Sperry began to approach a break in the ridge as well as a cold front, causing the storm to recurve to the northeast, becoming the first storm of the season to interact with mid-latitude westerlies. Thunderstorm activity quickly became displaced from the center due to increased wind shear, and the JMA downgraded Sperry into a severe tropical storm at 00:00 UTC on June 30. On the next day, both the JTWC and JMA declared Sperry an extratropical cyclone, although its remains later merged with a frontal zone.

=== Typhoon Thelma (Katring) ===
- Very strong typhoon (JMA)
- Category 4 super typhoon (SSHWS)
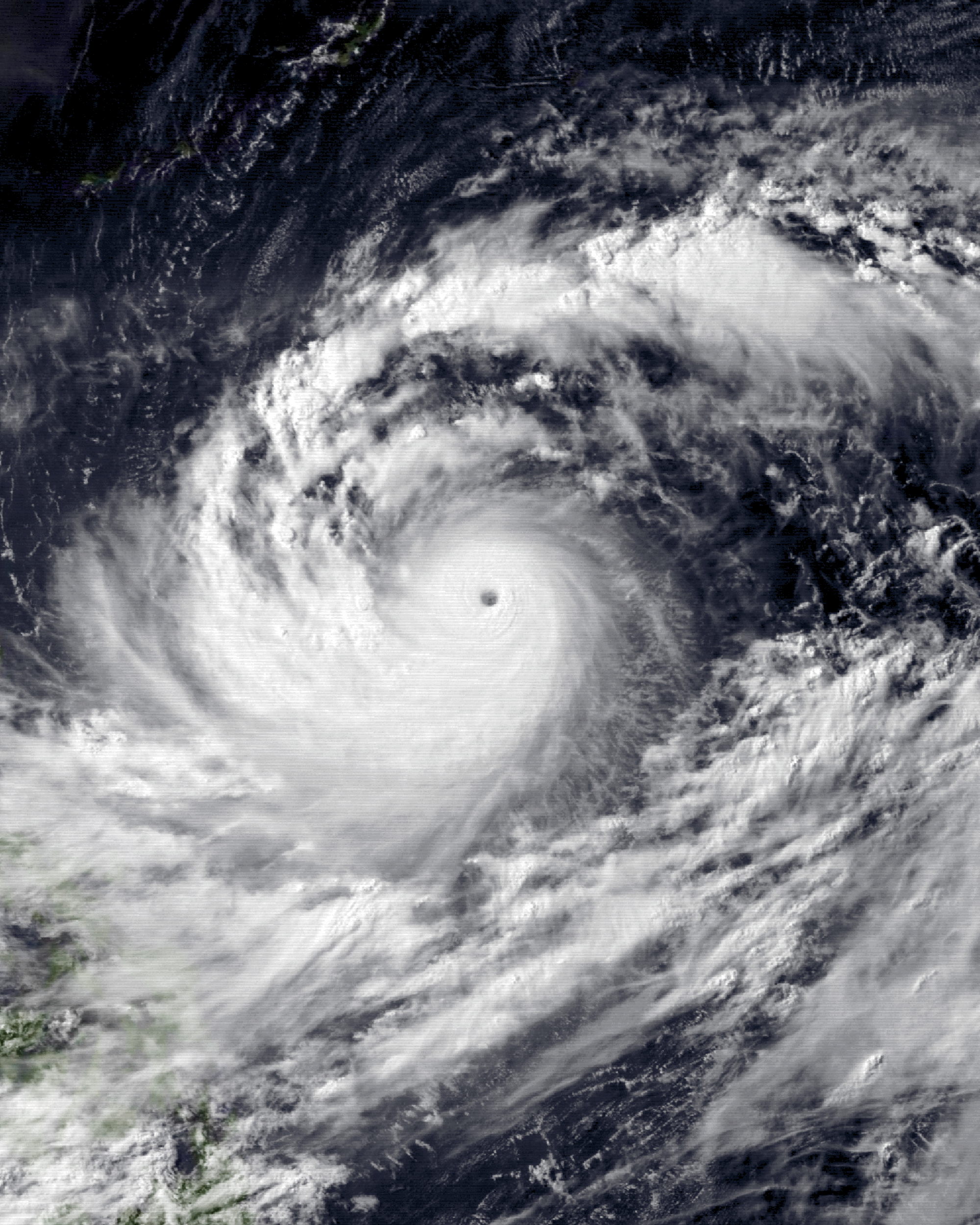
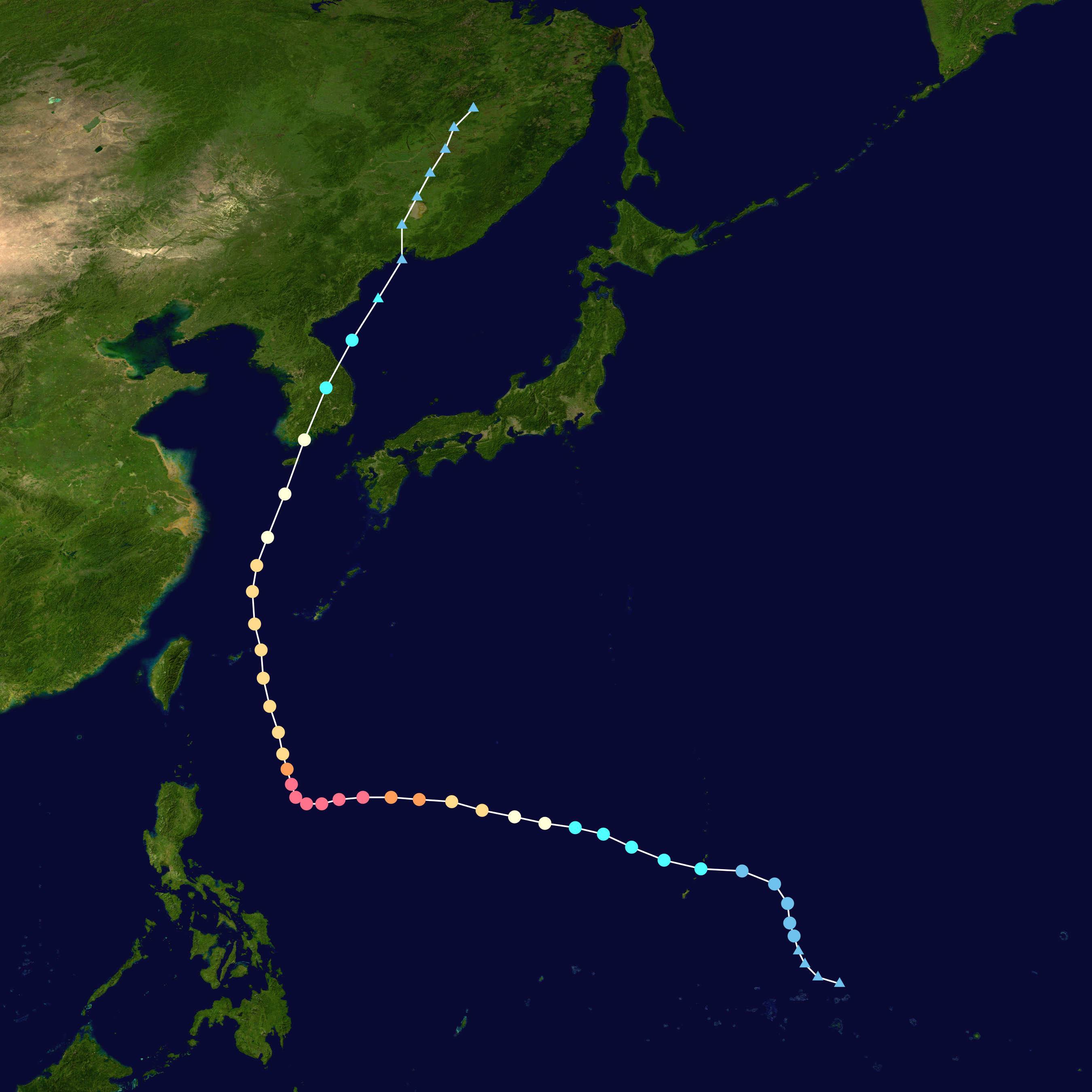
- Duration: July 6 – July 16
- Peak intensity: 185 km/h (115 mph) (10-min); 915 hPa (mbar)

Thelma was first designated by the JMA as a tropical depression on July 7. After moving north, Thelma turned west, while remaining poorly organized. It finally attained typhoon status on July 9, soon after developing an eye, and began to intensify at a brisker clip, and on July 10, the JTWC upgraded Thelma into the first super typhoon of the season. During the evening of July 10, Thelma attained maximum intensity while well to the east of the Philippines. It also turned sharply northward in response to a trough while also slowly weakening. On July 15, Typhoon Thelma, now greatly reduced in intensity, struck the south coast of South Korea. The next day, Thelma rapidly dissipated, shortly after emerging into the Sea of Japan. 138 people were killed by Thelma.

=== Severe Tropical Storm Vernon (Diding) ===
- Severe tropical storm (JMA)
- Category 1 typhoon (SSHWS)
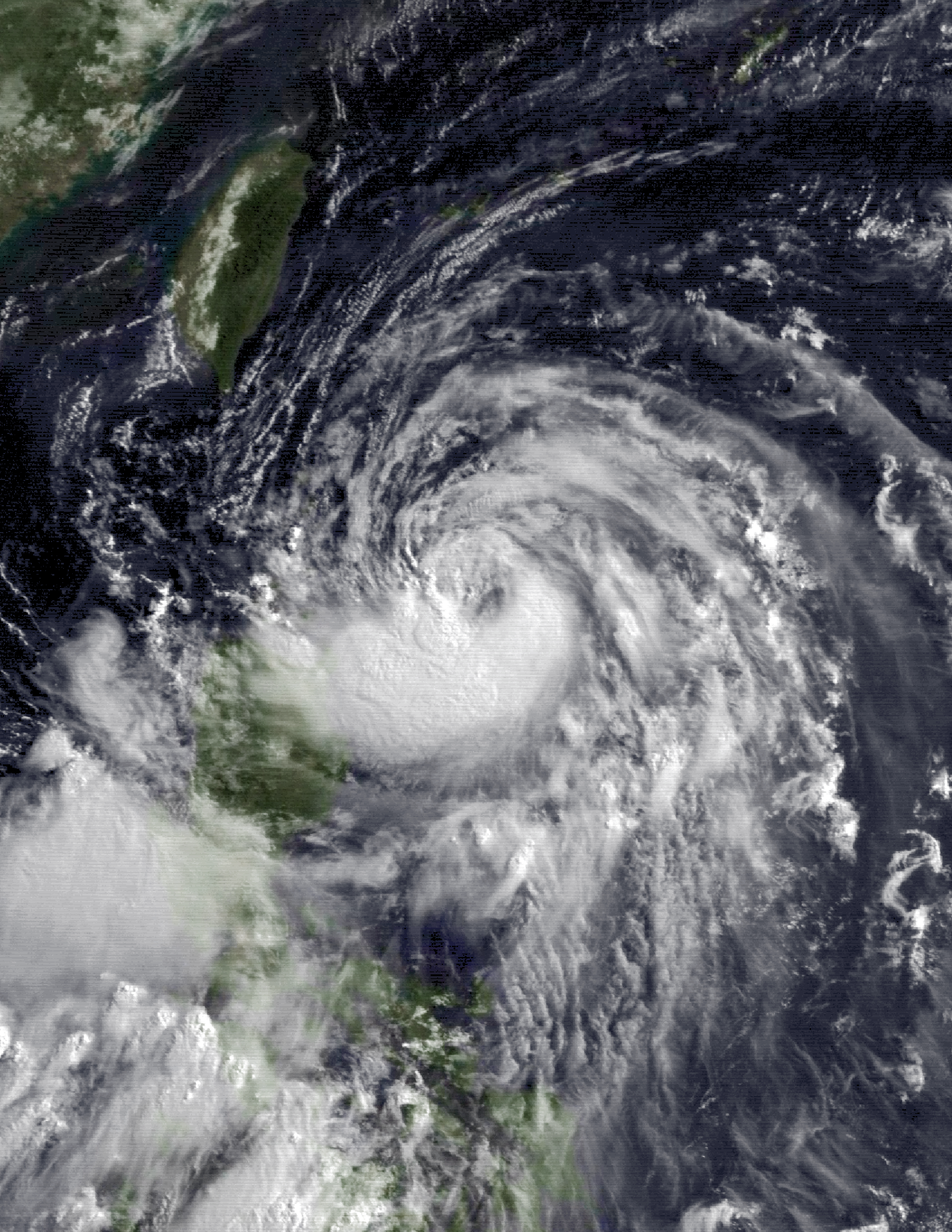
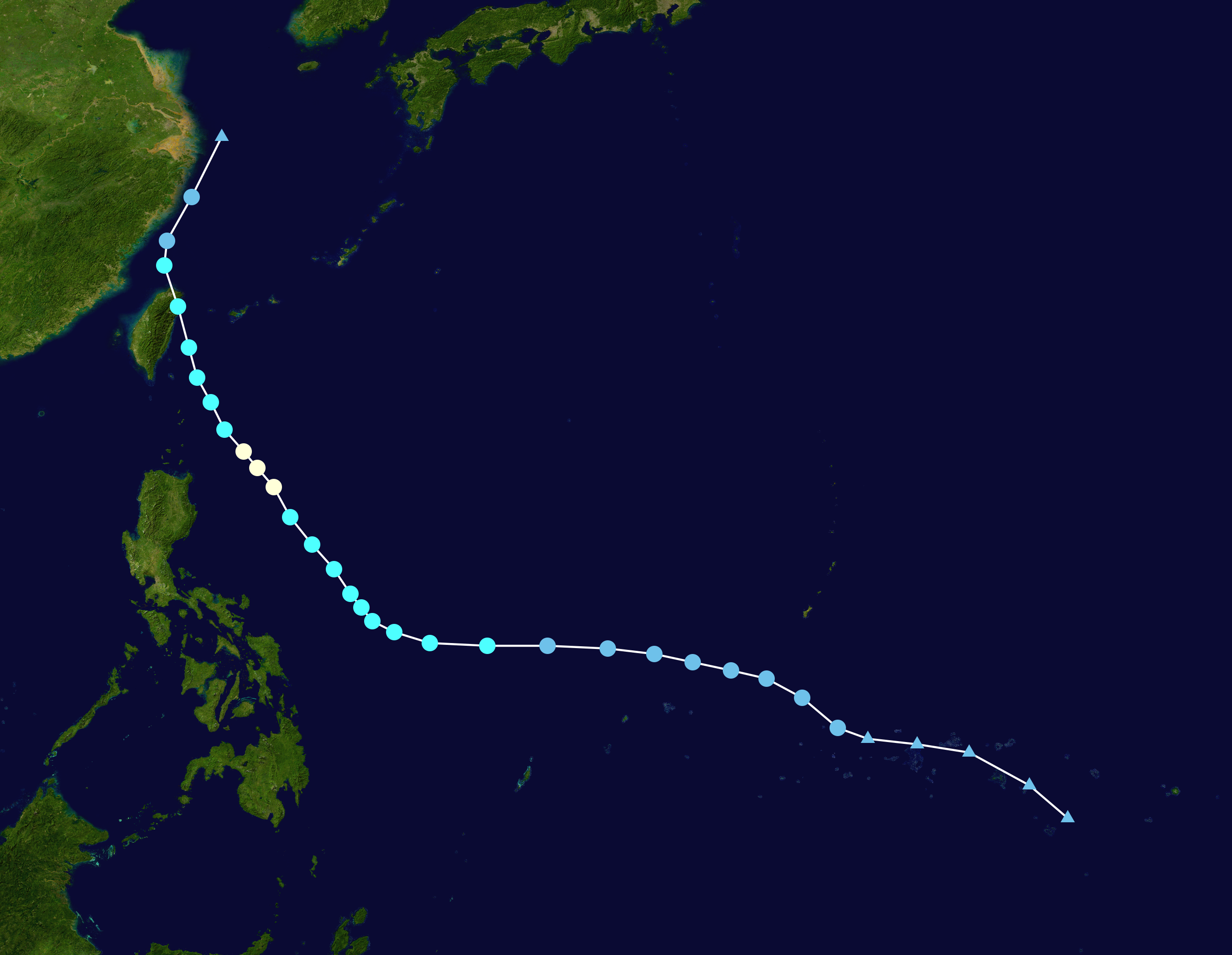
- Duration: July 15 – July 22
- Peak intensity: 110 km/h (70 mph) (10-min); 985 hPa (mbar)

On July 14, an area of disturbed weather formed while embedded in the near-equatorial monsoon trough in the eastern Caroline Islands. A well-defined low level circulation quickly developed, but convective activity remained limited until July 16, when both the JTWC and JMA upgraded the system into a tropical depression. Initially, the depression moved westwards towards the central Philippines while remaining disorganized. The JMA upgraded Vernon into a tropical storm at noon on July 18, and a severe tropical storm 12 hours later. At midday on July 1, the JTWC upgraded Vernon into a typhoon. Vernon began to track northwestward in the general direction of Taiwan. On July 20, the JMA estimated that Vernon reached its peak intensity, with winds of 115 km/h (70 mph). Shortly after its peak, Typhoon Vernon began to interact with the rugged terrain of Taiwan as it skirted the eastern shore and the JTWC and JMA estimated that Vera rapidly weakened to a tropical depression on July 21. Vernon dissipated in the East China Sea on July 22 after passing the northern tip of Taiwan.

=== Typhoon Wynne (Gening) ===
- Very strong typhoon (JMA)
- Category 4 typhoon (SSHWS)
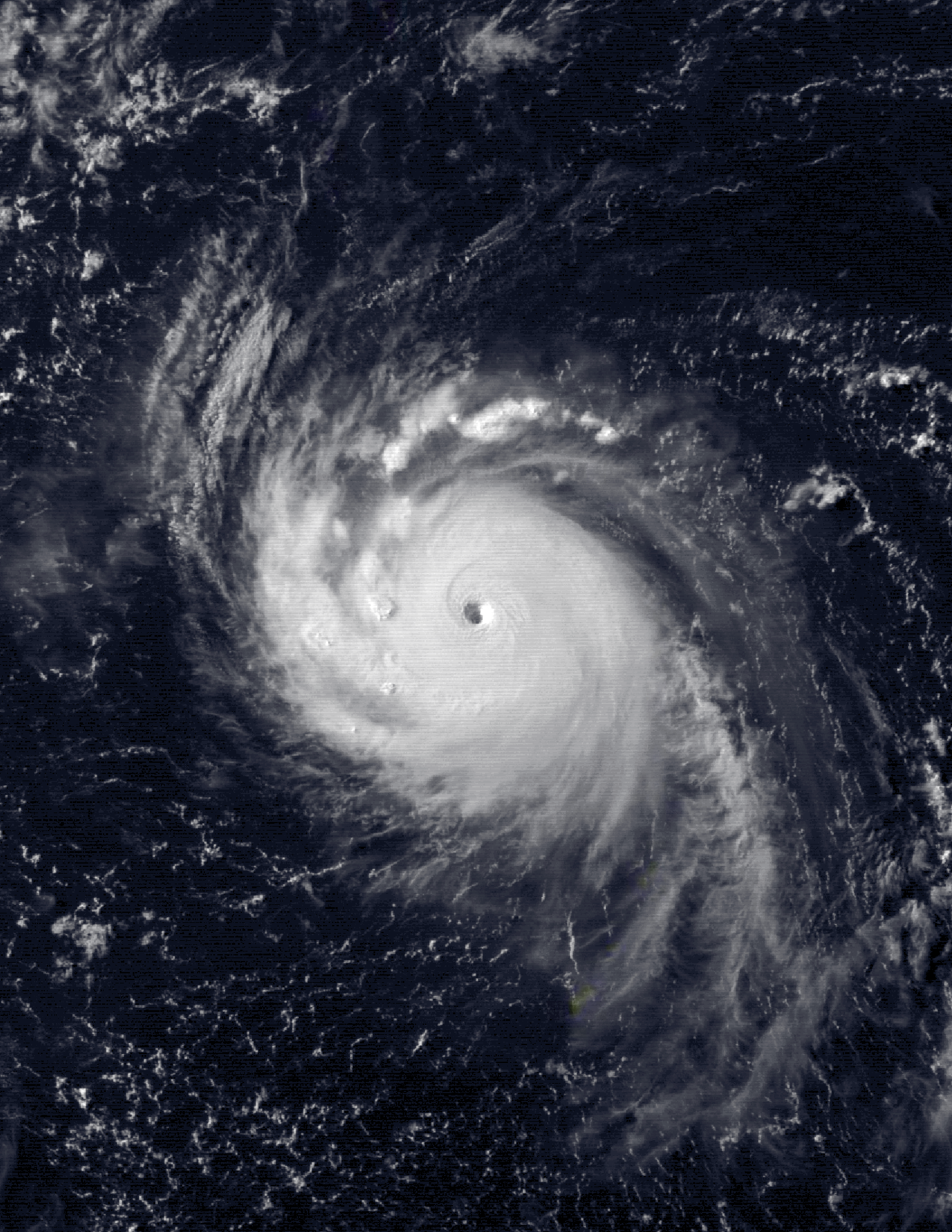
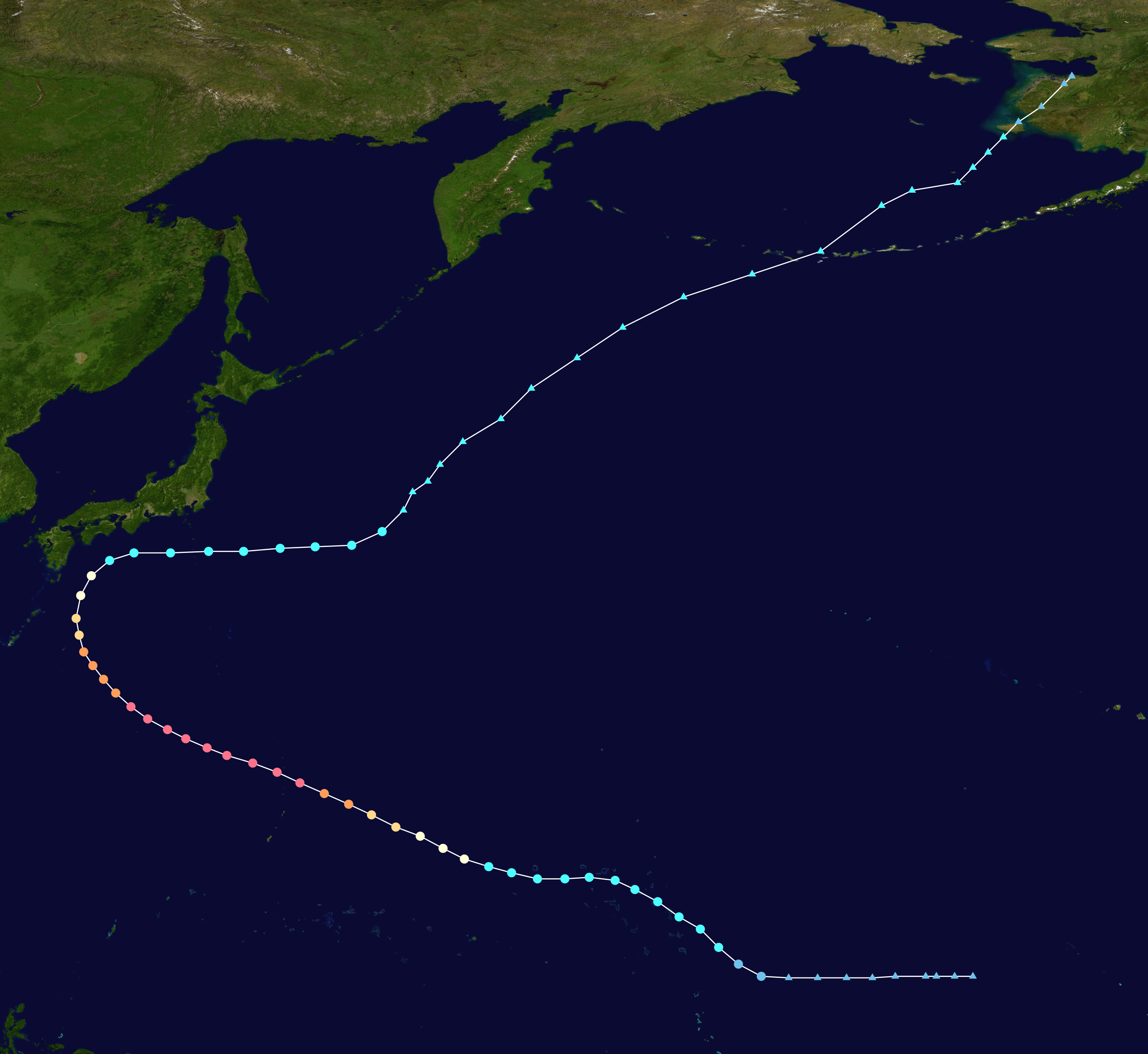
- Duration: July 18 – August 1
- Peak intensity: 185 km/h (115 mph) (10-min); 920 hPa (mbar)

The initial disturbance that would become Typhoon Wynne formed east of the International Date Line on July 20. Embedded in an environment of moderate wind shear, the disturbance slowly became more organized while tracking west. On July 21, the JMA classified the system as a tropical depression. Both the JTWC and JMA upgraded the depression into Tropical Storm Wynne at 06:00 UTC on July 22. After Wynne developed a central dense overcast, a large mass of deep convection, the JMA upgraded Wynne to a severe tropical storm midday on July 23. Later that day, the JTWC upgraded Wynne into a typhoon while the typhoon passed over the northern Marianas island of Alamagan. On the next day, after the storm developed an eye, the JMA followed suit and classified Wynne as a typhoon. A smaller than average typhoon, Wynne turned west-northwest. By July 26, Wynne reached its maximum intensity, with the JTWC reporting winds of 230 km/h (145 mph) and the JMA reporting winds of 185 km/h (115 mph). of 145 mph (233 km/h). As it rounded the western periphery of the subtropical ridge, the cyclone became sheared from the north, which caused the storm to weaken and its center to become exposed from the deep convection. Even so, it maintained typhoon intensity until July 30, according to both agencies. Recurving east of Honshū, Wynne continued to weaken. Both the JTWC and JMA determined that Wynne transitioned into an extratropical cyclone by the afternoon of July 31, although the JMA continued to track Wynne for five additional days.

Prior to the arrival of the typhoon on Alamagan, a handful of people sought shelter. All coconut trees and 90–100% of crops on islands of Alamagan and Agrihan were destroyed by the typhoon. All structures on Alamgan were destroyed, including the radio tower, which was the island's communication to the rest of Saipan. However, there were no serious injuries or deaths.

=== Typhoon Alex (Etang) ===
- Typhoon (JMA)
- Category 1 typhoon (SSHWS)
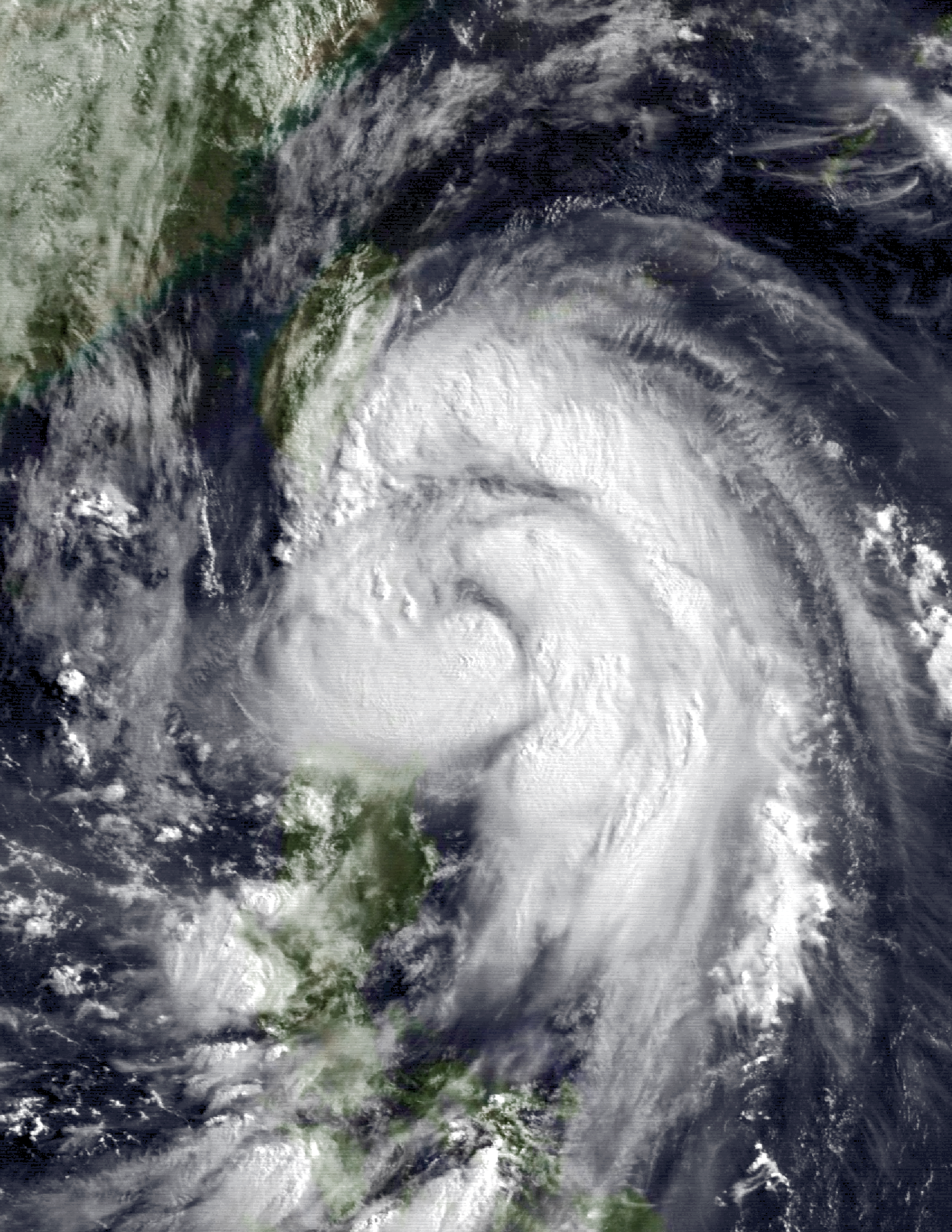
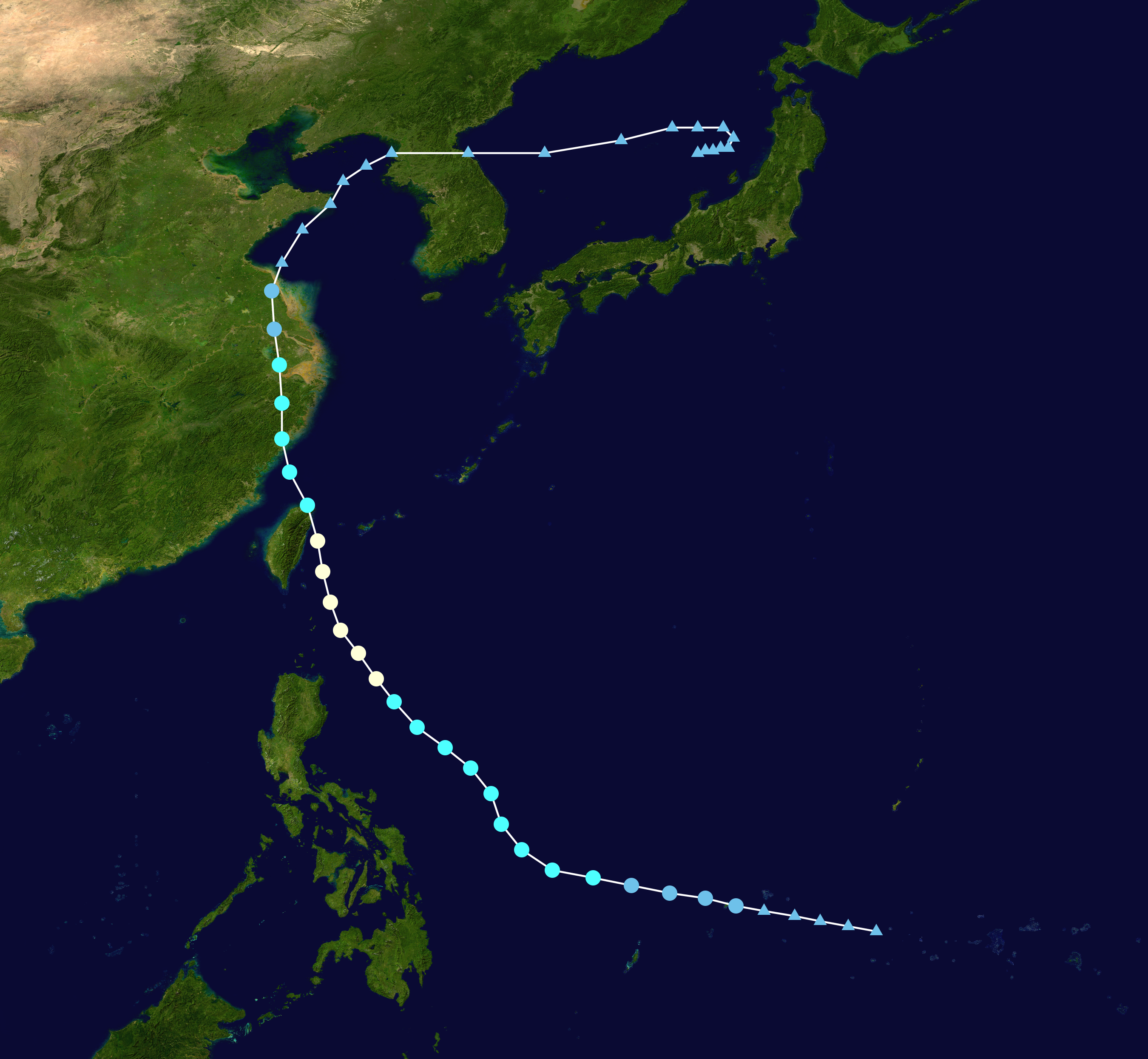
- Duration: July 21 – July 30
- Peak intensity: 120 km/h (75 mph) (10-min); 970 hPa (mbar)

A tropical disturbance formed from a monsoon trough across the Caroline Islands on July 21. The system organized and convection increased rapidly, thus the JTWC named the storm Alex on the 23rd. Although initial models predicted Alex was to track through the Philippines, JTWC forecasters believed that Alex would track northward. On August 25, Alex reached peak intensity of 75 mph (120 km/h). It remained as that intensity for a full day before slowly weakening while trekking towards the Luzon Straight. The low-level southerly flow east of a frontal boundary across eastern China caused Alex to brush the Taiwanese coast. 1 person was reported dead in Taiwan. Once passing Taiwan, Alex tracked slightly westward and made landfall over Wenzhou, Zhejiang on the 27th. 125 deaths was reported in East China. The remnants of Alex aided a rainband over the Korean Peninsula that dumped over 12 inches (300 mm) of rain within 24-hours. The remnants of Alex dissipated on the 30th.

=== Typhoon Betty (Herming) ===
- Violent typhoon (JMA)
- Category 5 super typhoon (SSHWS)
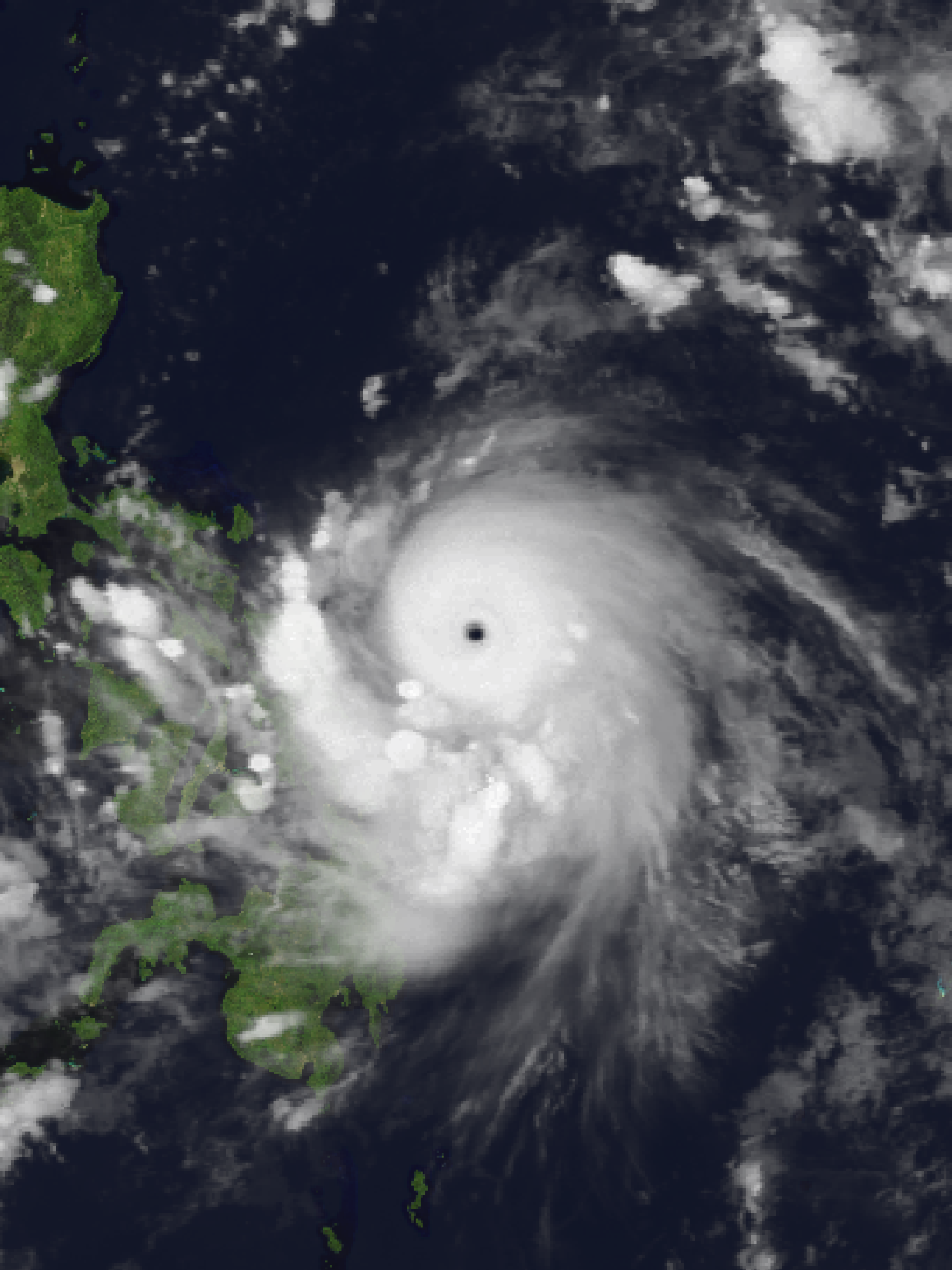
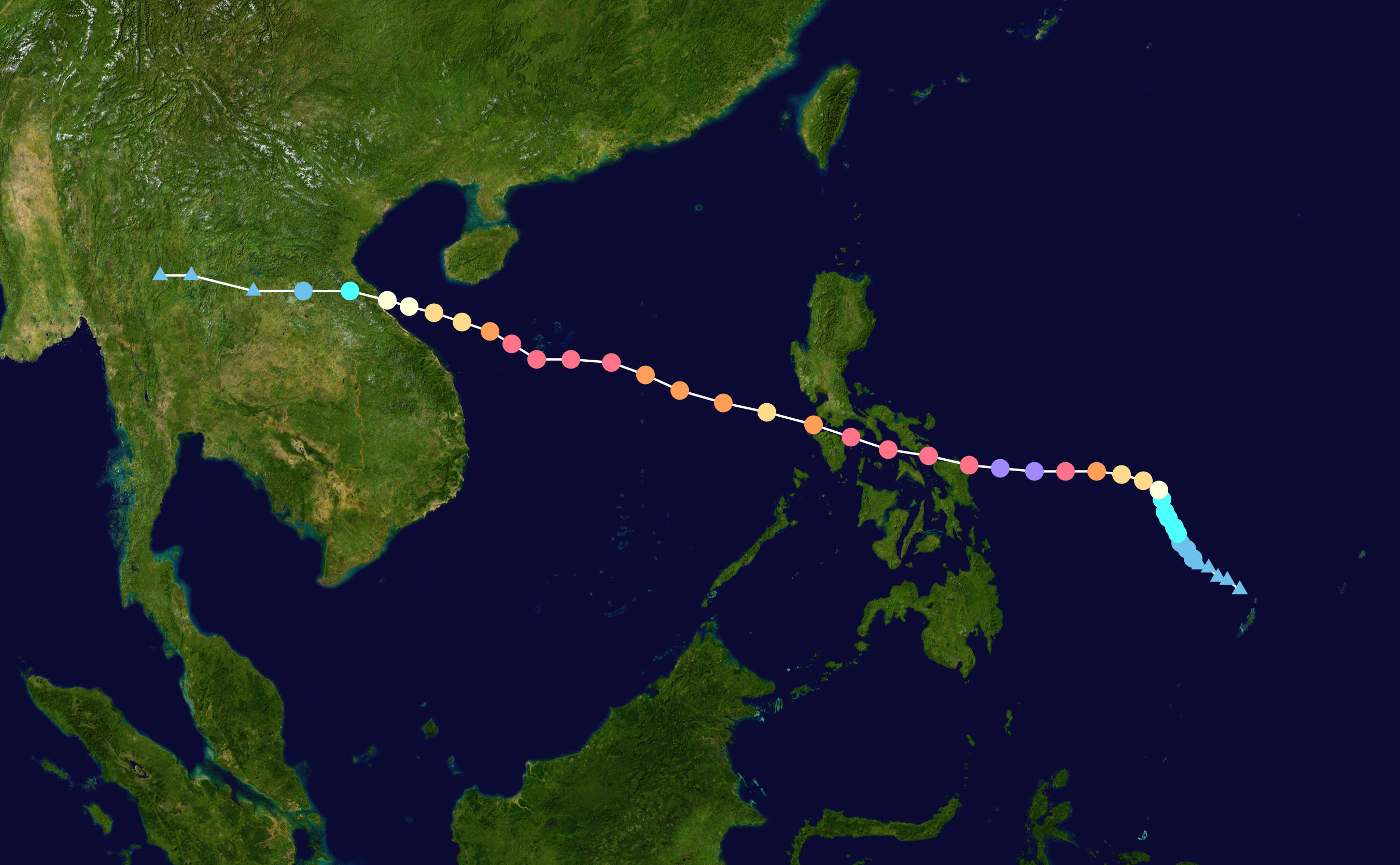
- Duration: August 7 – August 17
- Peak intensity: 205 km/h (125 mph) (10-min); 890 hPa (mbar)

Typhoon Betty formed from the monsoon trough that, according to the JMA, spawned a tropical depression on August 8 while around positioned well to the east of the Philippines. It drifted northwestward, becoming a tropical storm on August 9 and a typhoon on August 10. Betty turned westward, where it rapidly intensified, becoming the second super typhoon of the season, before attaining peak intensity on August 11. The next day, Typhoon Betty made landfall in the central Philippines. Betty weakened rapidly over the country, but restrengthened somewhat over the South China Sea. Land interaction weakened Betty slightly before it hit central Vietnam on August 16. The lowest station pressure measured at a weather station in Đồng Hới on August 16 was 987 hPa. The next day, Betty dissipated. Betty killed 92 people

=== Typhoon Cary (Ising) ===
- Typhoon (JMA)
- Category 2 typhoon (SSHWS)
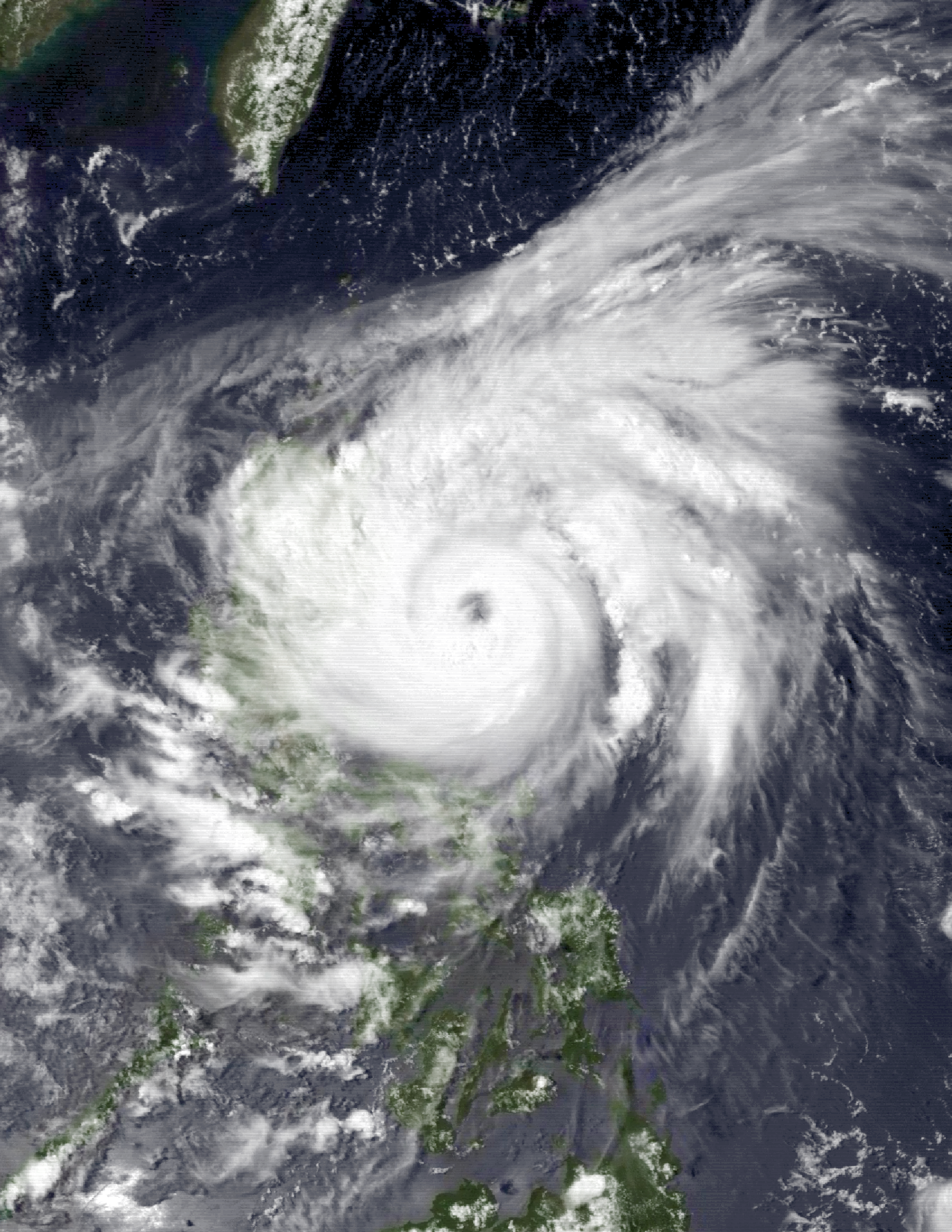
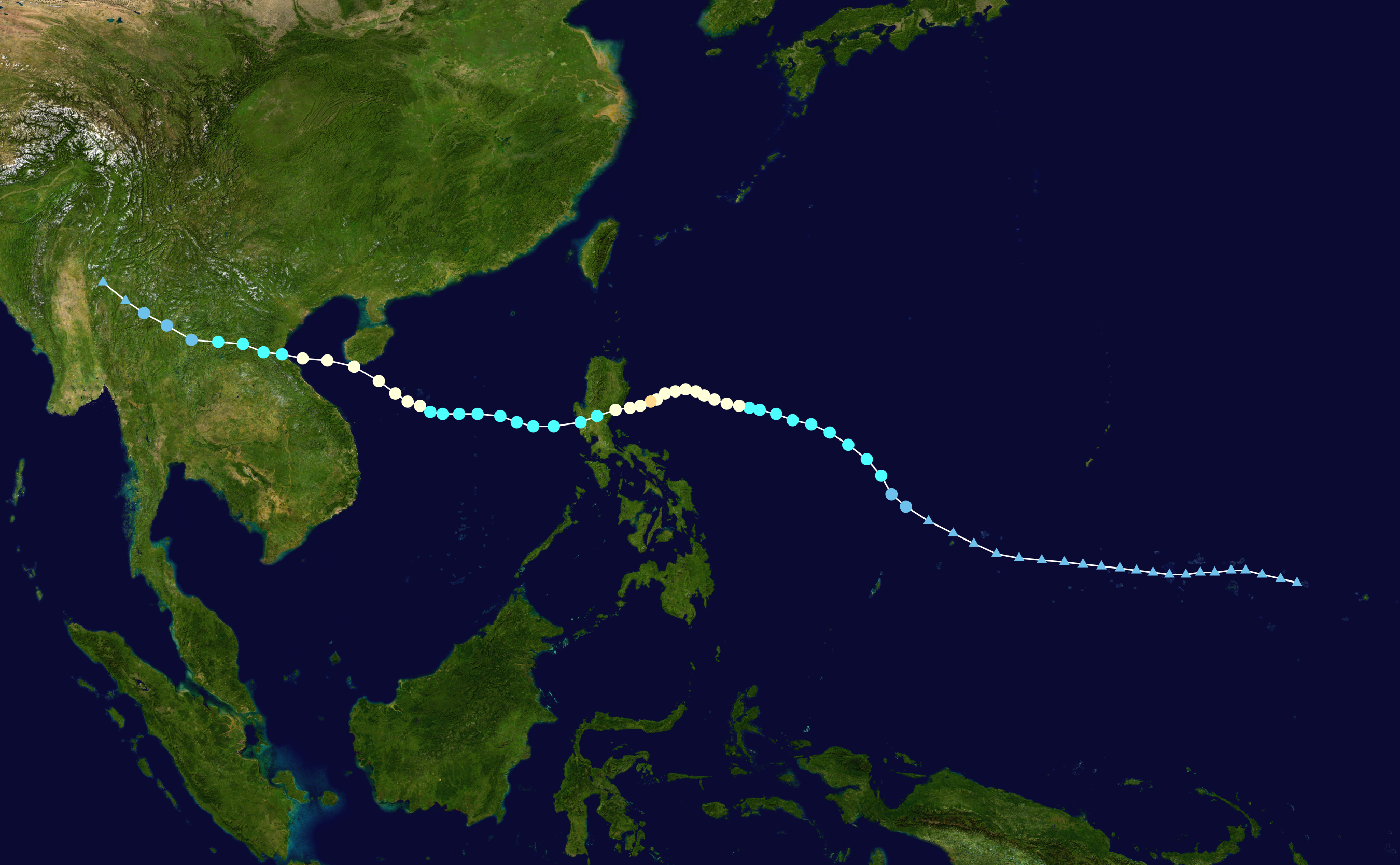
- Duration: August 7 – August 24
- Peak intensity: 140 km/h (85 mph) (10-min); 960 hPa (mbar)

Cary formed on the August 7th and started to move westward, the storm peaked to a Category 2 storm and struck the Philippines, this resulted in 25 casualties and $5.58 million of damage. The storm weakened inland Vietnam

=== JMA Tropical Storm Ten ===
- Tropical storm (JMA)
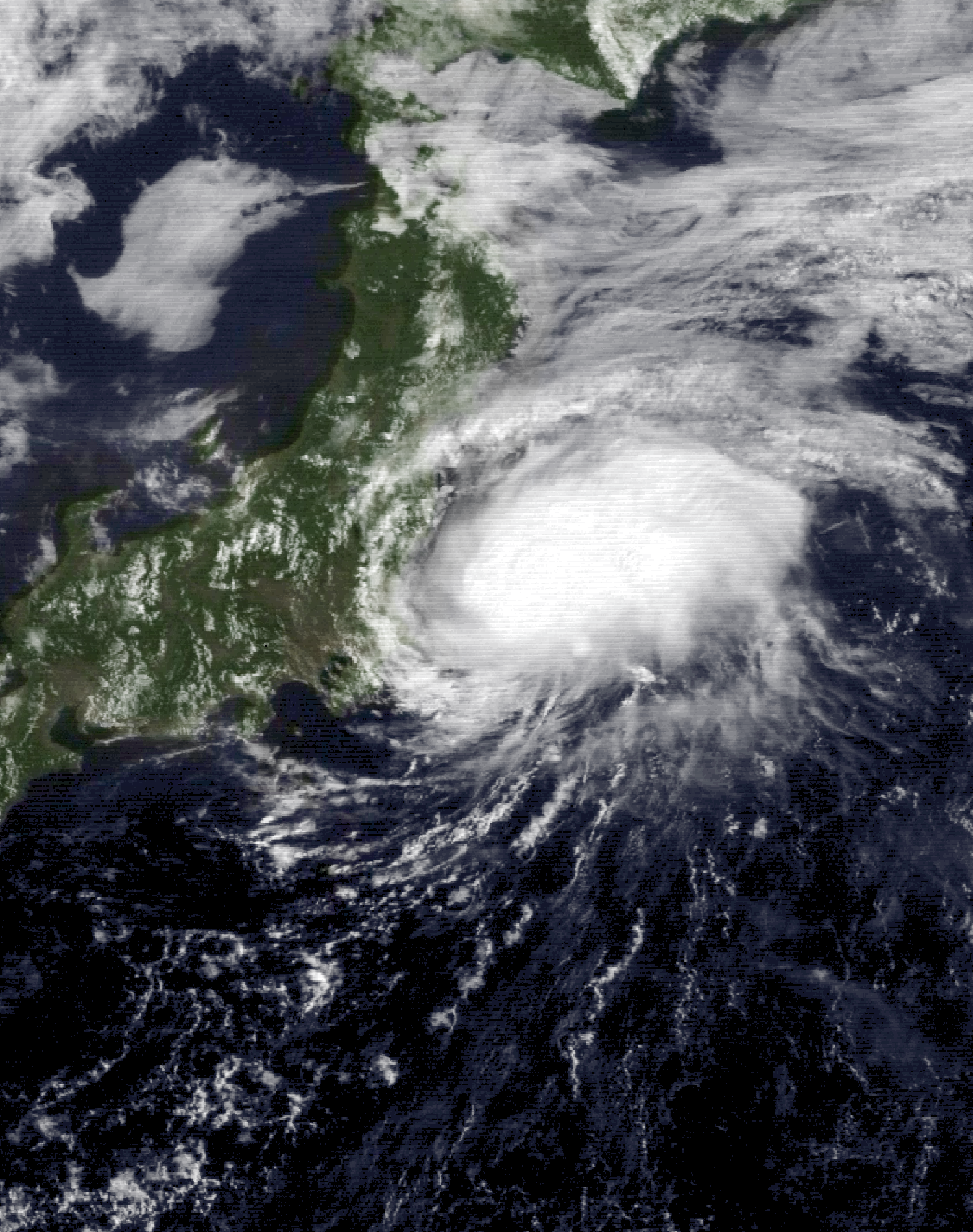
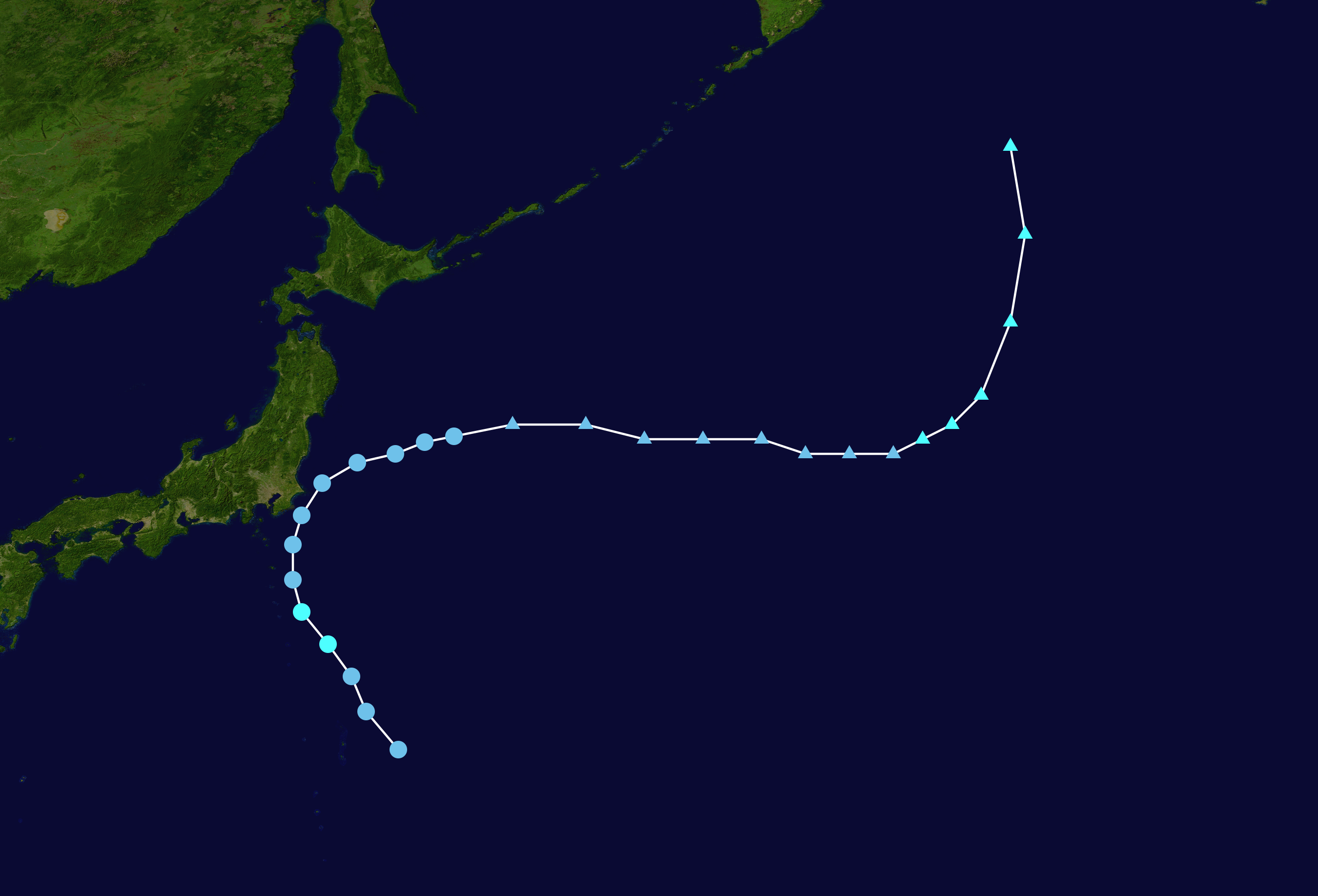
- Duration: August 10 – August 13
- Peak intensity: 65 km/h (40 mph) (10-min); 1006 hPa (mbar)

This system was not tracked by the JTWC.

=== Typhoon Dinah (Luding) ===
- Very strong typhoon (JMA)
- Category 4 super typhoon (SSHWS)
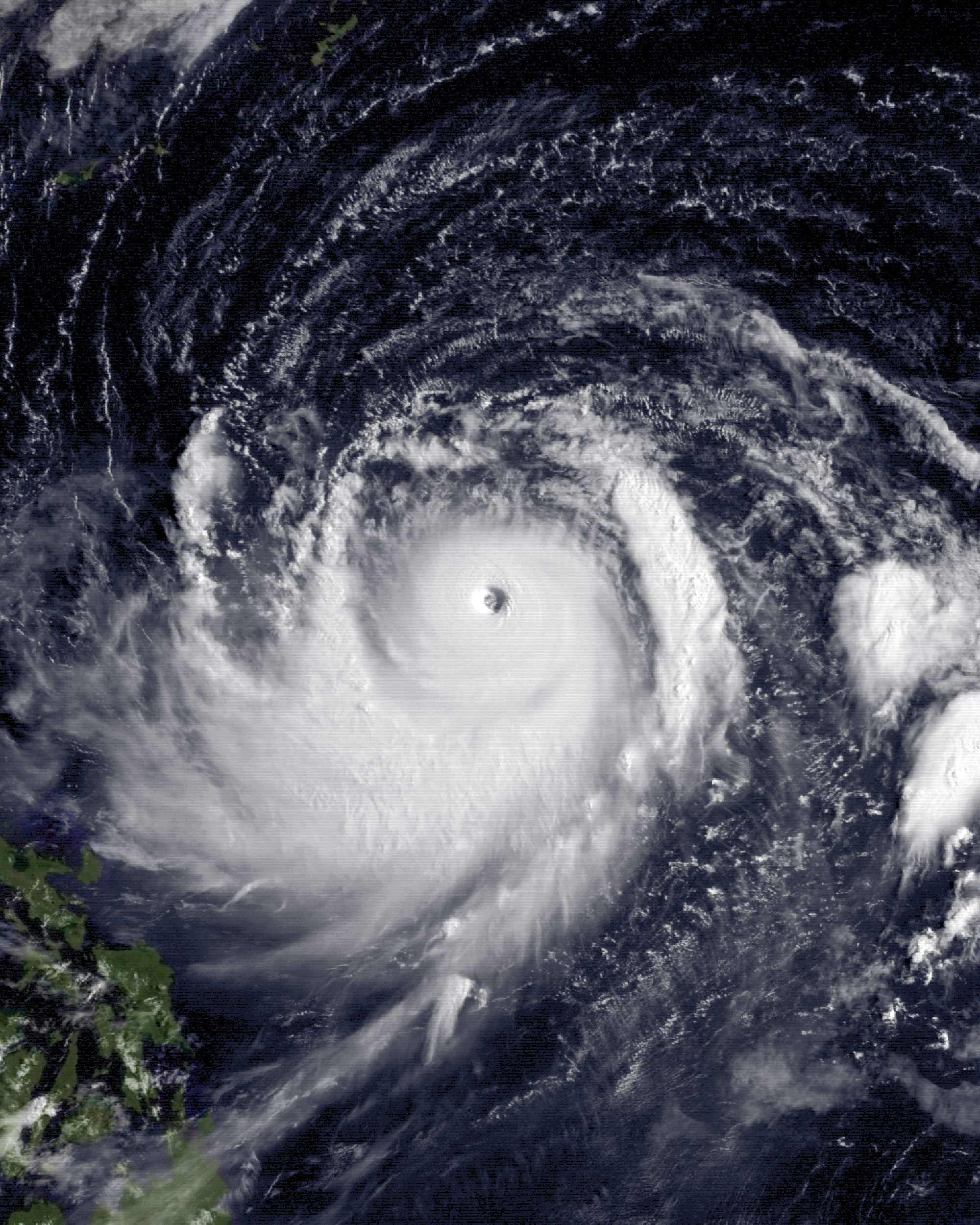
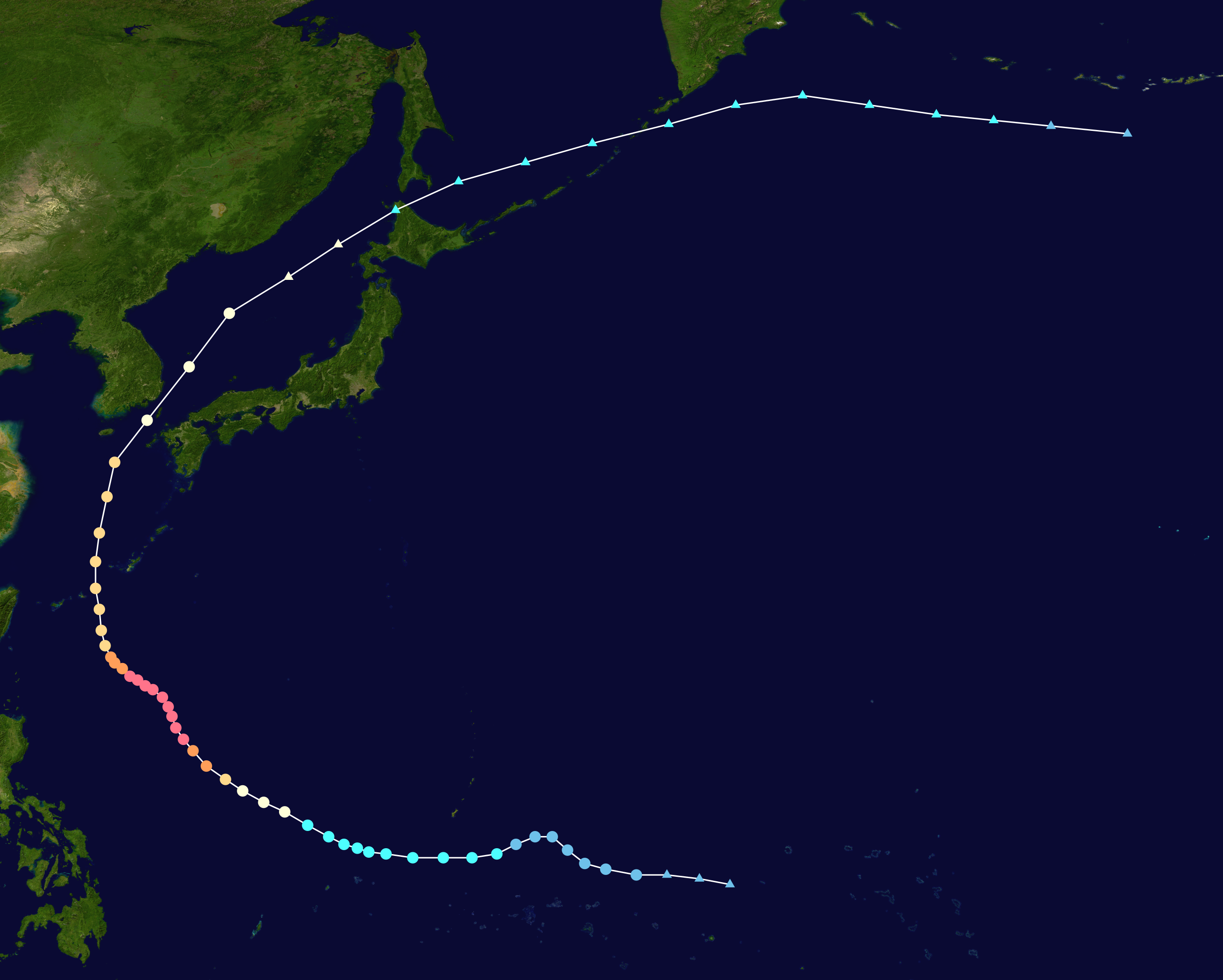
- Duration: August 19 – August 31
- Peak intensity: 185 km/h (115 mph) (10-min); 915 hPa (mbar)

An area of low pressure developed near Guam on August 19, and on August 21, the low reached tropical storm intensity as it moved generally west. Intensification was initially gradual, but Dinah became a typhoon early on August 24, and subsequently began to intensify at a faster pace. Dinah reached its highest strength on August 26 before turning northward on August 28 and into a less favorable conditions aloft, which prompted weakening. Dinah entered the Sea of Japan after passing near Okinawa on August 29, where Dinah leveled off in intensity. The system then began to recurved towards southwestern Japan, and after passing through the area, Dinah transitioned into an extratropical cyclone on August 31, although the remnants could be traced for four more days as it approached the International Date Line. Across Okinawa, one person was killed, six more were injured, eight homes were destroyed or seriously damaged, and 13 boats sunk or were damaged. Damage exceeded $1.3 million (1987 USD). On the island of Kyushu, 250 homes were flooded and about 450,000 homeowners lost power. Throughout Japan, eight people perished, and 89 were wounded. The typhoon destroyed nearly 40,000 dwellings and an additional 600 were flooded. In South Korea, 4,372 structures were destroyed, leaving more than 11,000 people homeless. Nationwide, the typhoon was responsible for flooding 80,000 hectares (200,000 acres) of crops. Property damage was estimated at $39.1 million.

=== Tropical Depression Ed ===
- Tropical depression (JMA)
- Tropical storm (SSHWS)
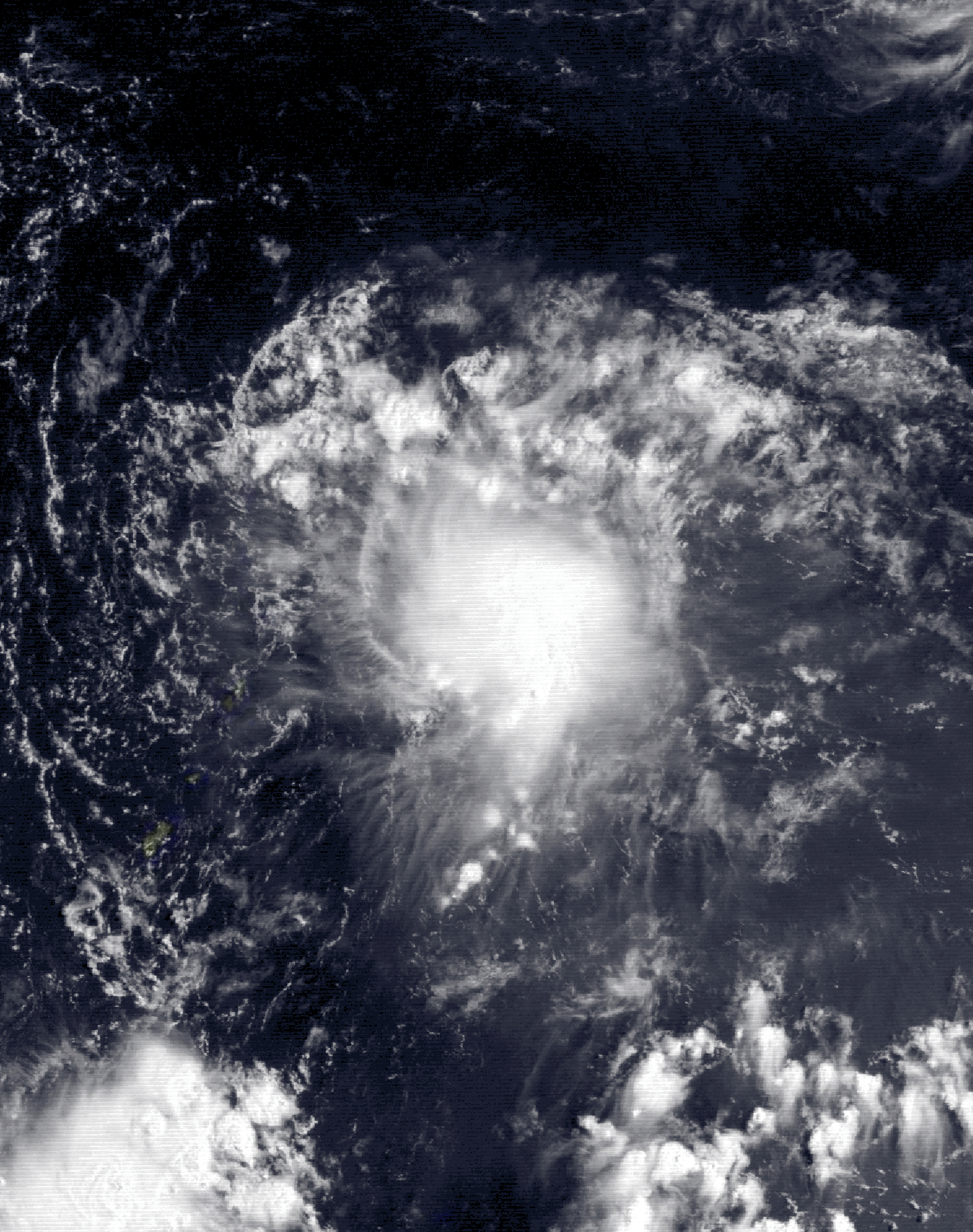
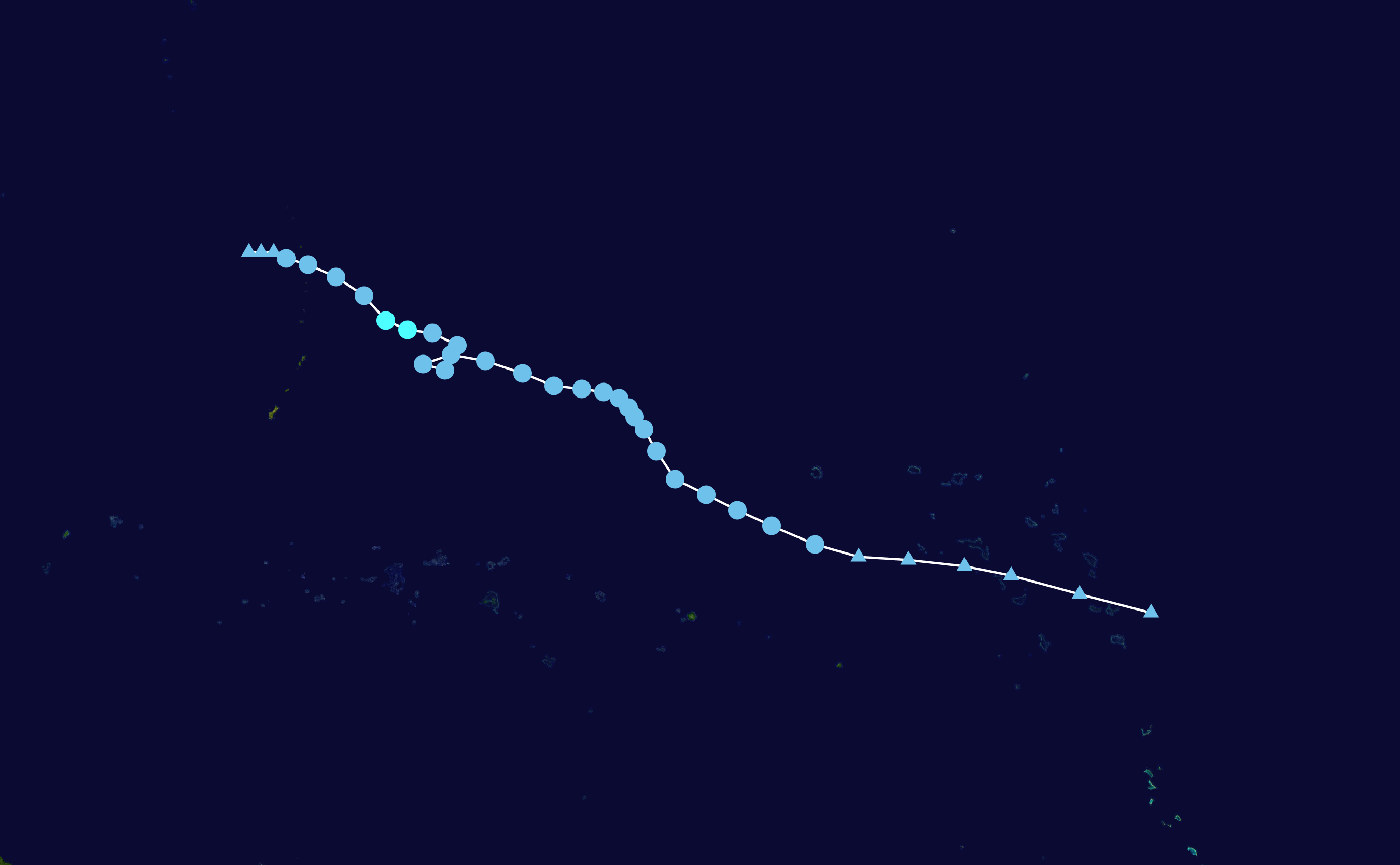
- Duration: August 21 – August 29
- Peak intensity: 65 km/h (40 mph) (1-min); 1006 hPa (mbar)

A tropical disturbance was first detected east of the Marshall Islands on August 20th. The disturbance organized as it quickly moved west-northwest and a Tropical Cyclone Formation Alert (TCFA) was first issued at 0600 UTC on August 21 as both central convection and upper-level outflow improved, and 18 hours later it was designated Tropical Depression 12W by the Joint Typhoon Warning Center (JTWC). However, 12W was initially short lived, as decreased organization prompted the JTWC to issue its final warning on the depression at 0600 UTC on August 23, although they continued to monitor the system for signs of regeneration. On August 26, 12W was upgraded to a tropical depression once again, and by 0000 UTC on August 27, the depression was upgraded to a tropical storm, receiving the name Ed. Ed peaked soon after with estimated 1-minute sustained winds of 65 km/h (40 mph). The system was once again short lived, and the JTWC issued its final warning for the system at 0000 UTC on August 28 as convection was stripped away from the low-level circulation.

=== Typhoon Gerald (Neneng) ===
- Typhoon (JMA)
- Category 3 typhoon (SSHWS)
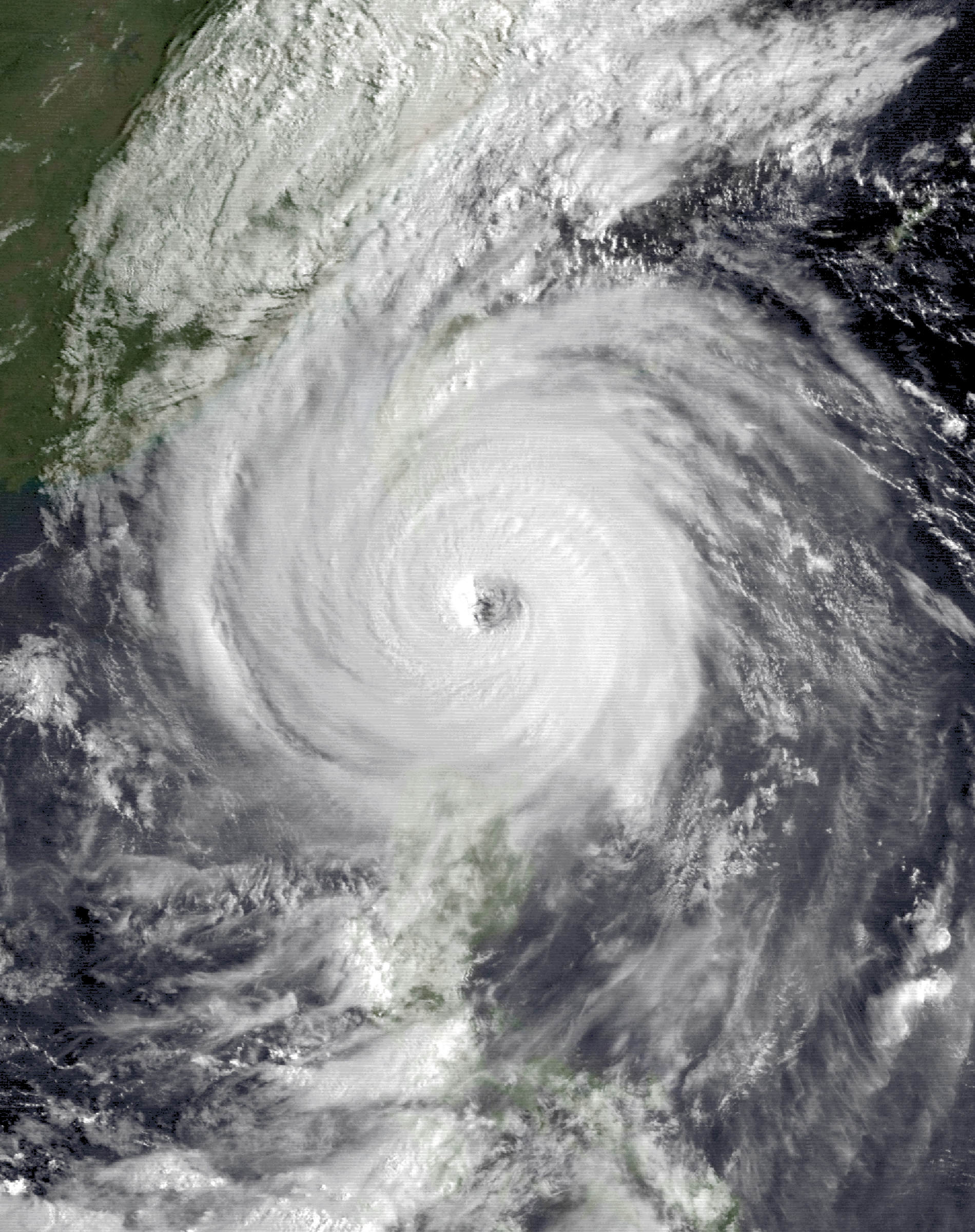
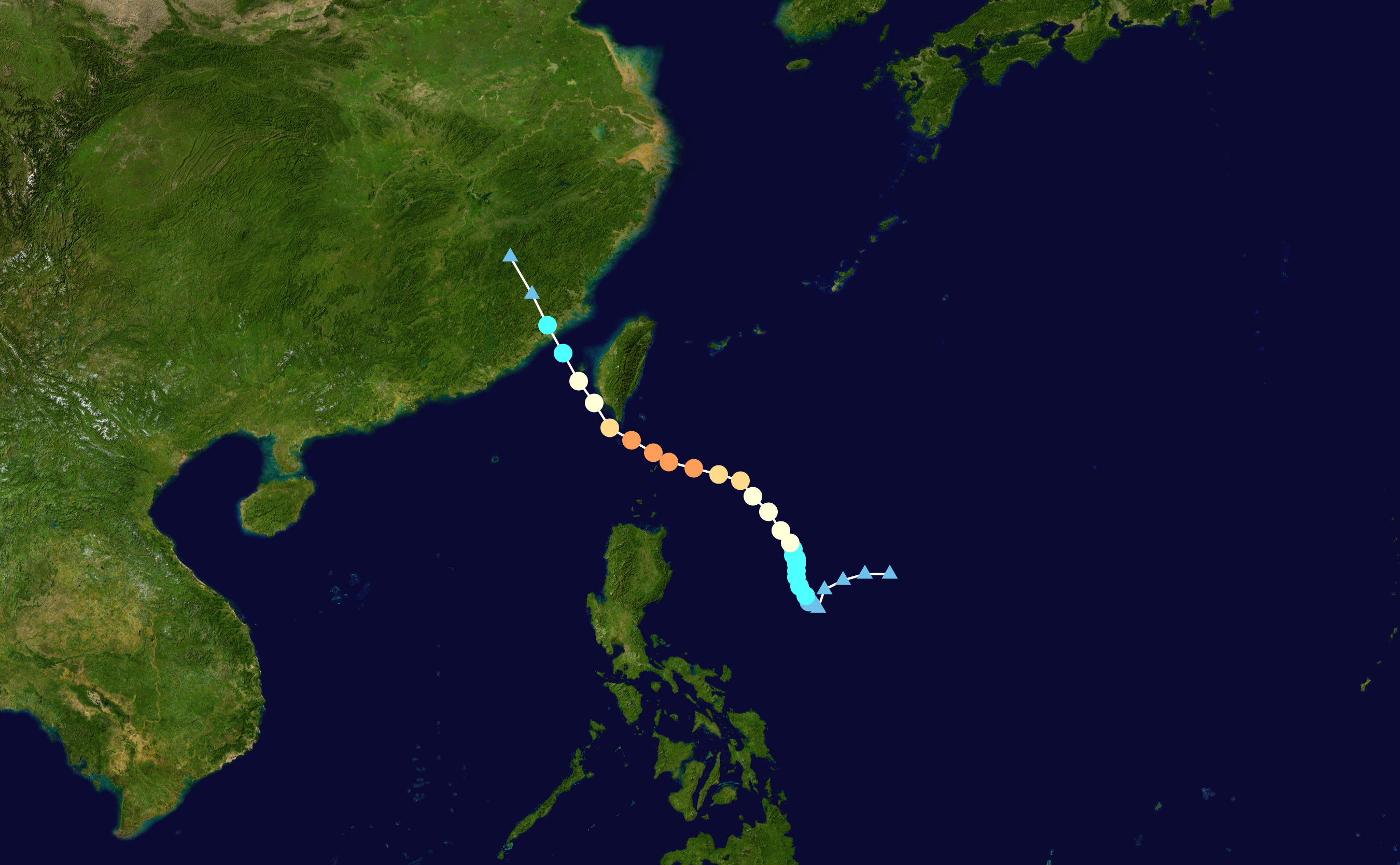
- Duration: September 4 – September 11
- Peak intensity: 150 km/h (90 mph) (10-min); 950 hPa (mbar)

On September 4 a tropical depression formed east of Luzon from the monsoon trough. It remained embedded within the trough, and moved erratically, drifting northward to become a tropical storm late on the 4th. Gerald turned more to the northwest, reached typhoon strength on the 7th, and continued to intensify to a peak of 120 mph (190 km/h) on the 8th. It passed south of Taiwan, disrupting the circulation and weakening it as it continued to the west-northwest. Gerald hit southeast China as a 65 mph (105 km/h) tropical storm on the 10th, and dissipated the next day. Mudslides and torrential flooding up to 16 inches (410 mm) in some locations resulted in $131 million in damage (1987 USD) and 127 fatalities.

=== Typhoon Freda ===
- Violent typhoon (JMA)
- Category 4 typhoon (SSHWS)
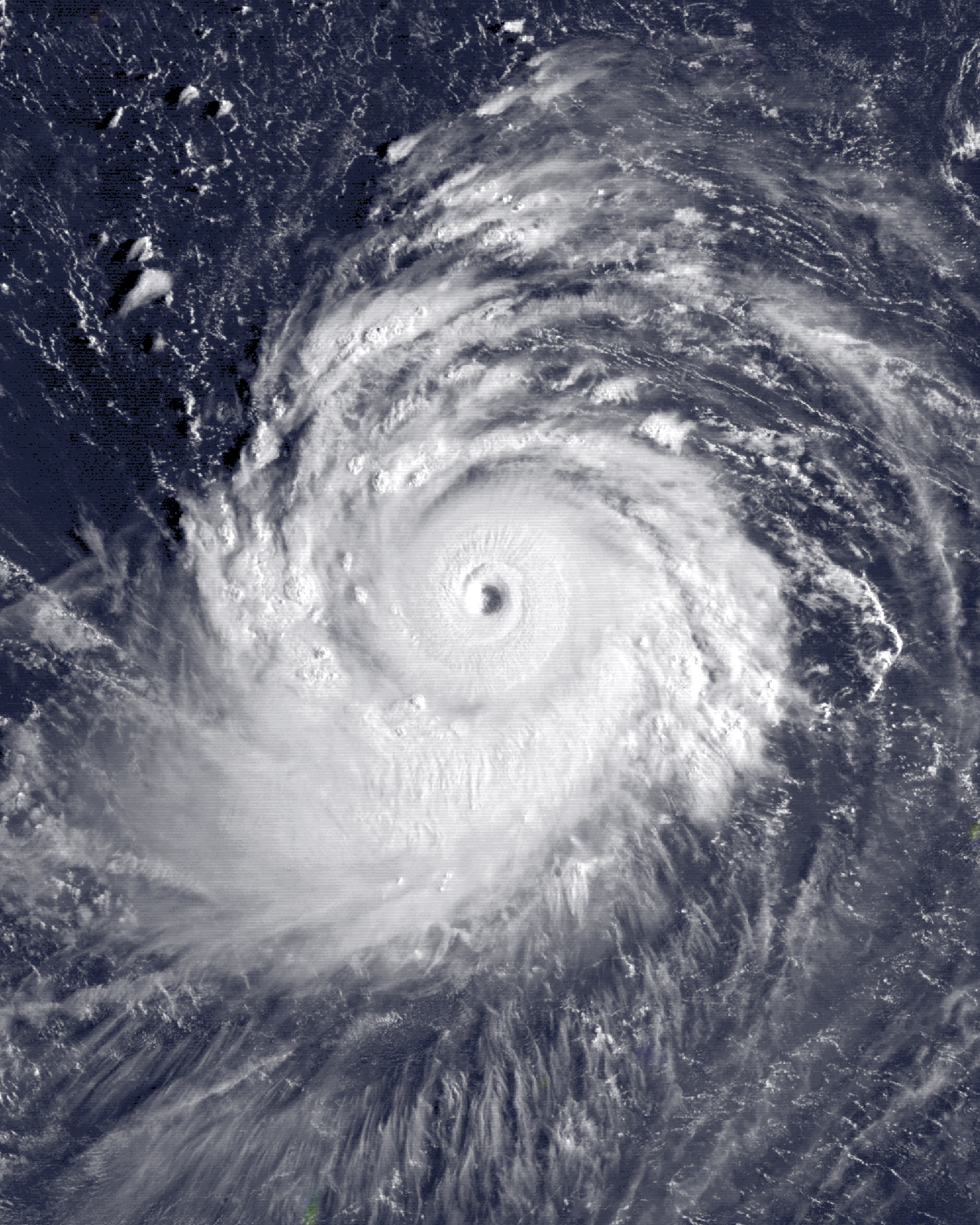
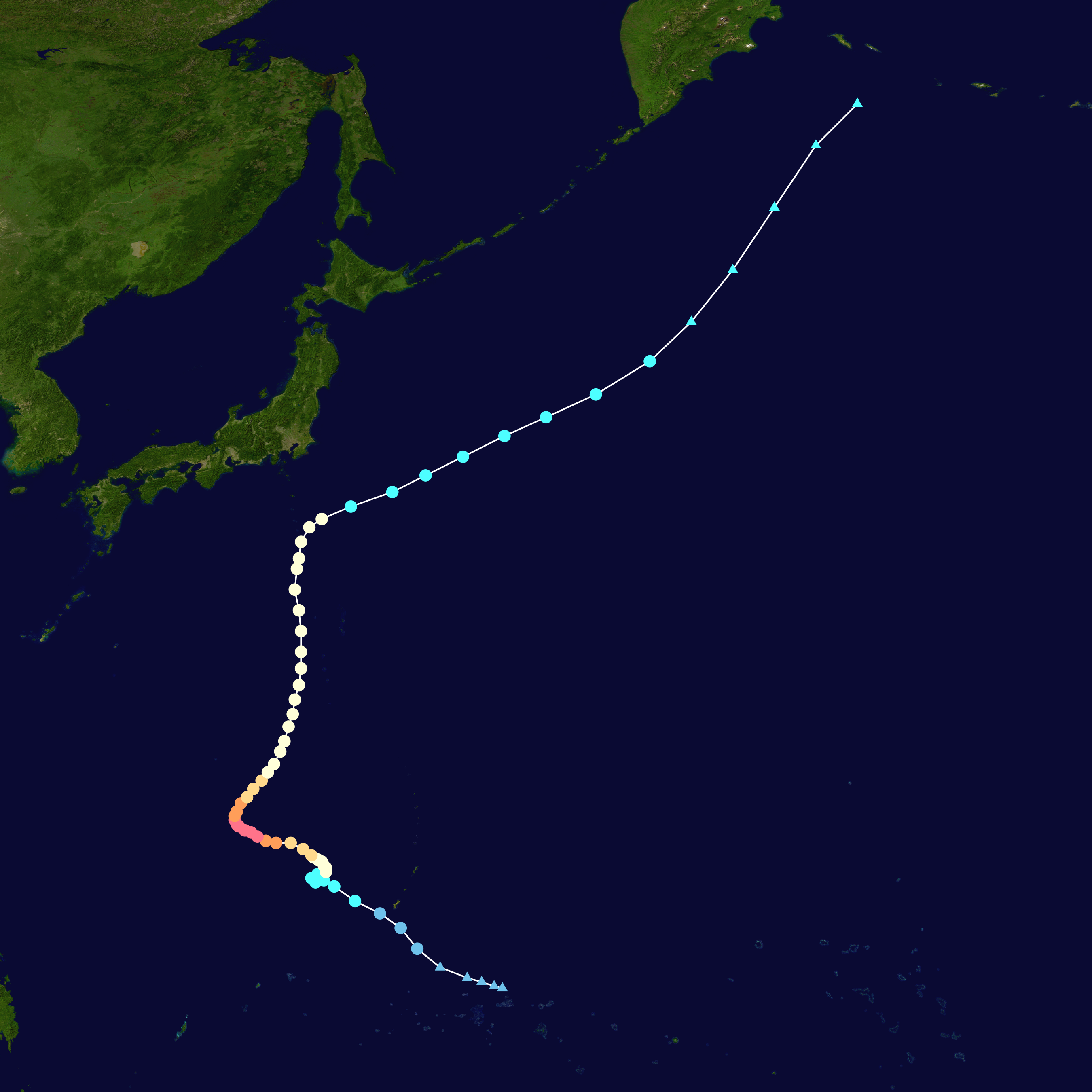
- Duration: September 4 – September 17
- Peak intensity: 195 km/h (120 mph) (10-min); 915 hPa (mbar)

Typhoon Freda developed from an active monsoon trough; the precursor disturbance to Freda was first noted on September 1. A low-level center first began evident two days later, and on September 4, the JMA classified the disturbance as a tropical depression, with the JTWC following suit at 18:00 UTC that day. After passing Guam, Freda began to intensify at a faster clip; both the JTWC and JMA upgraded the depression into Tropical Storm Freda on the morning of September 5. Quasi-stationary, Freda steadily intensified, and following the appearance of a small eye on satellite imagery, Freda was upgraded into a typhoon by both the JTWC and JMA. After executing a small counterclockwise loop, Freda turned northeast. On September 10, the JTWC and JMA, based on Dvorak analysis, estimated that Freda reached its peak wind spreed, with winds of 235 and 195 km/h (145 and 120 mph) respectively. Typhoon Freda began to round the western periphery of a ridge, which caused the system to accelerate towards the north. The JTWC estimated that Freda weakened to a tropical storm during the evening hours of September 13; however, the JMA maintained the storm at typhoon intensity for several additional days. By September 16, Freda began to interact with a mid-level trough to the north, which resulted in a turn to the northeast. After bypassing Honshu, wind shear began to take toll on the system and Freda began to turn extratropical. On September 17, the JTWC declared Freda extratropical, with the JMA doing the same the following day. It was lasted noted on September 20.

Due to the storms erratic motion during its early stages, Guam received two distinct periods of heavy rainfall from the storm. On September 4, the typhoon dropped 109.3 mm (4.30 in), and four days later, 635 mm (25.0 in) was recorded on the island, along with gale-force winds. Throughout the Mariana Islands, rough seas damaged coral reefs and eroded beaches, but there were no casualties.

=== Typhoon Holly ===
- Violent typhoon (JMA)
- Category 5 super typhoon (SSHWS)
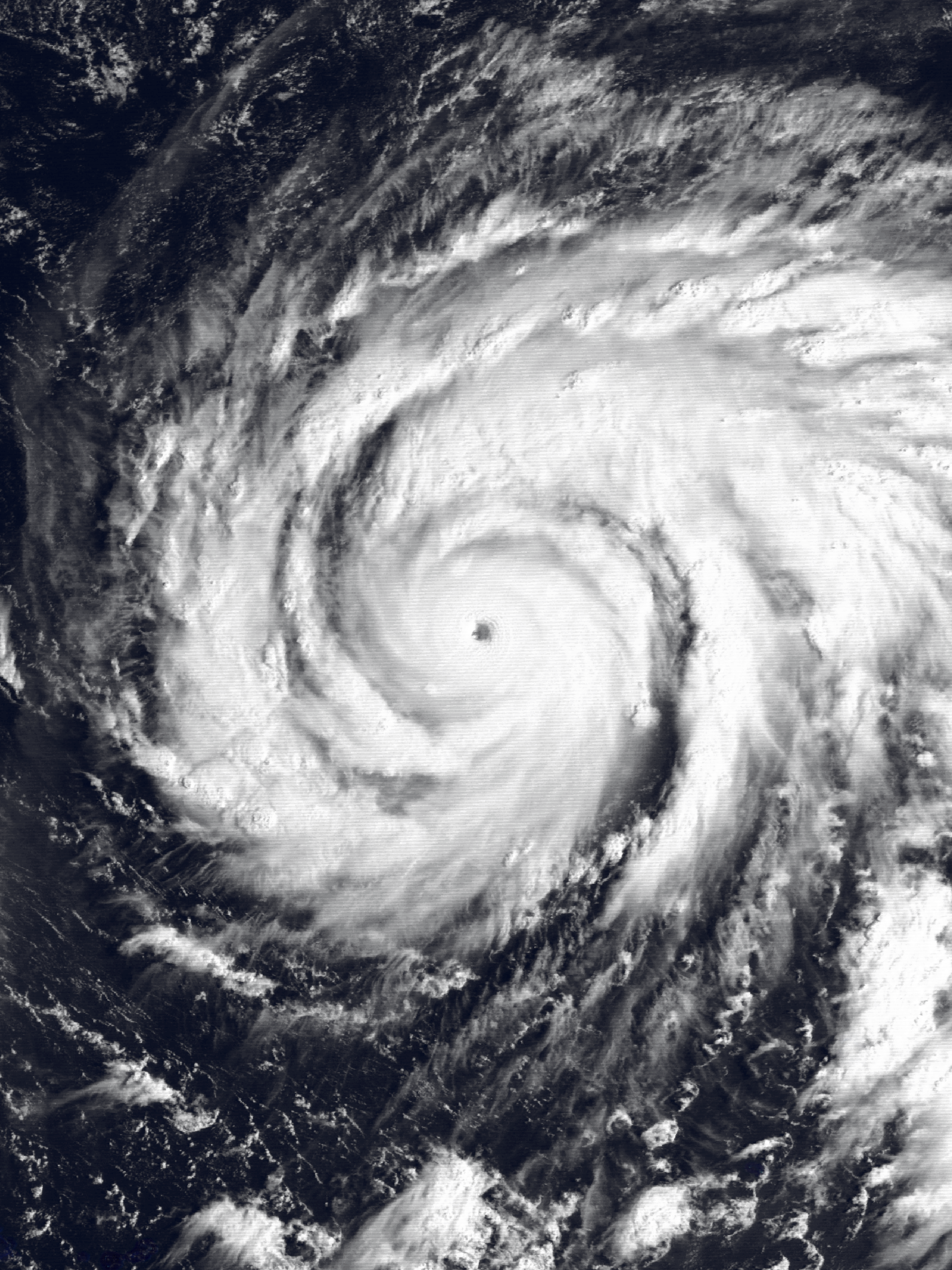
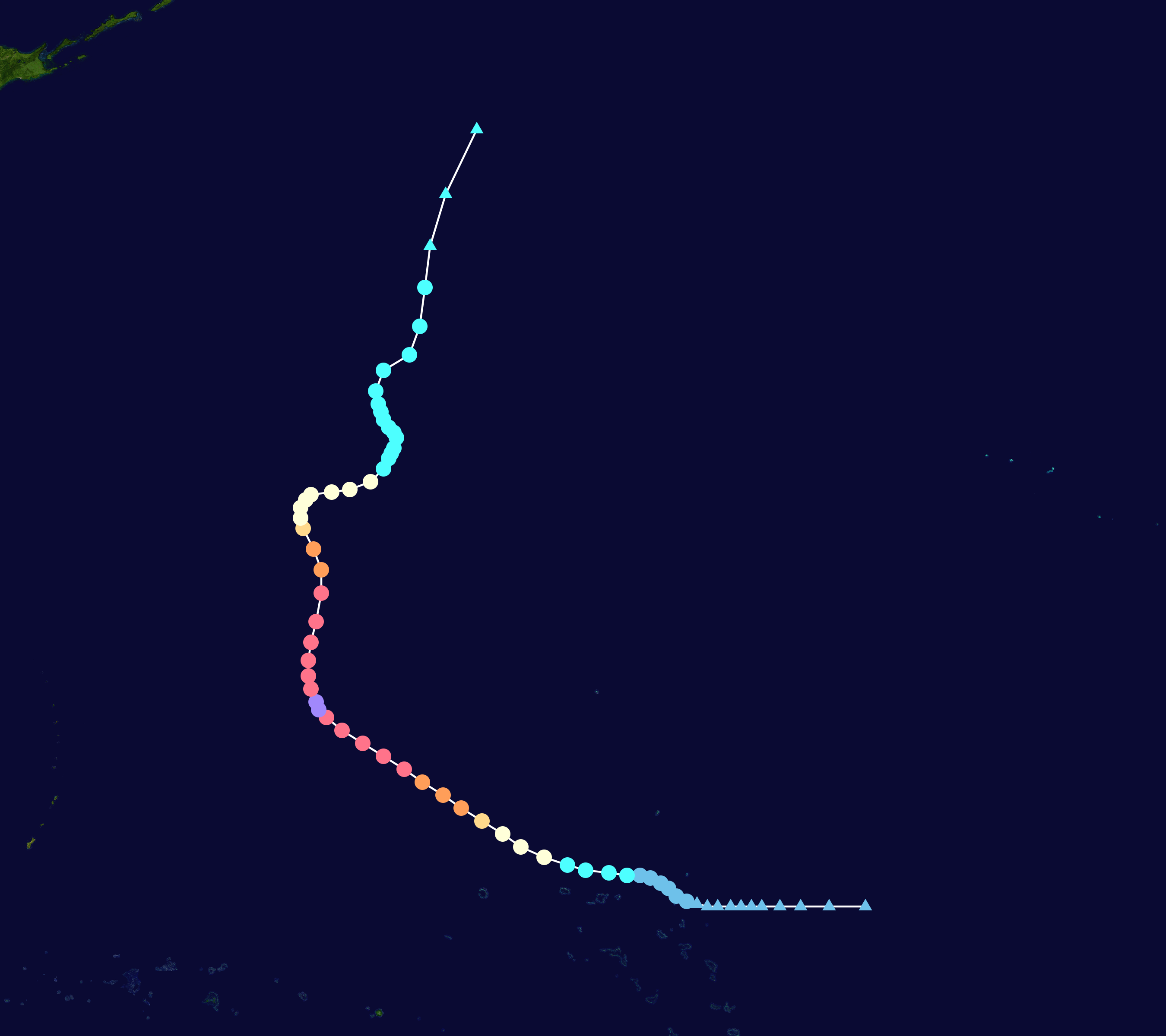
- Duration: September 4 – September 15
- Peak intensity: 205 km/h (125 mph) (10-min); 900 hPa (mbar)

The final of a three storm tropical cyclone outbreak, Holly began as a poorly organized but persistent area of convection at the eastern edge of the monsoon trough, which was displaced a bit to the north of its climatological position. Tracking westward, the disturbance gradually organized due to low wind shear. Shower and thunderstorm activity developed over the center, and at 00:00 UTC on September 5, the JMA classified the system as a tropical depression, with the JTWC doing the same six hours later. Although only slight intensification was expected, the depression took advantage of the favorable conditions. A central dense overcast quickly developed, and the JMA upgraded Holly into a severe tropical storm at noon on September 7 and a typhoon 12 hours later. The JTWC also designated Holly a typhoon on September 7. Following a 36-hour period of rapid deepening, the JMA estimated that Holly attained its peak intensity of 200 km/h (125 mph) midday on September 9. Meanwhile, the JTWC estimated winds of 255 km/h (160 mph), making Holly a super typhoon. Around this time, Holly veered from northwestward to northward caused by a weakness in the subtropical ridge. Holly steadily weakened as its forward motion decreased. On September 14, the JMA downgraded Holly to a severe tropical storm, while the JTWC estimated that Holly transitioned into a subtropical cyclone that day. the JTWC declared Holly an extratropical cyclone on September 15, with the JMA following suit two days later. The remnants of the typhoon lost its identity late on September 17. Throughout its lifetime, Typhoon Holly had no effects on land.

=== Typhoon Ian ===
- Typhoon (JMA)
- Category 3 typhoon (SSHWS)
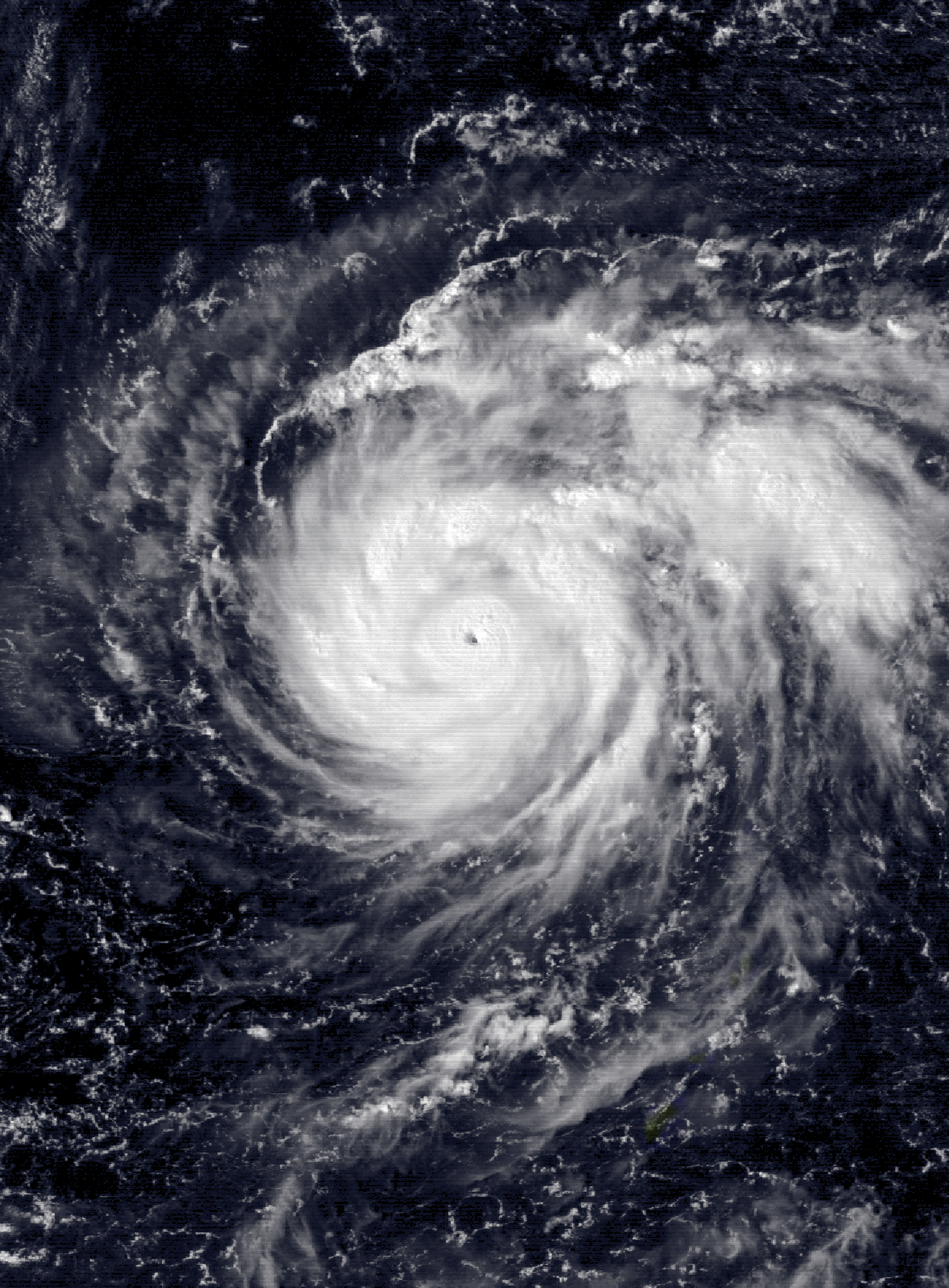
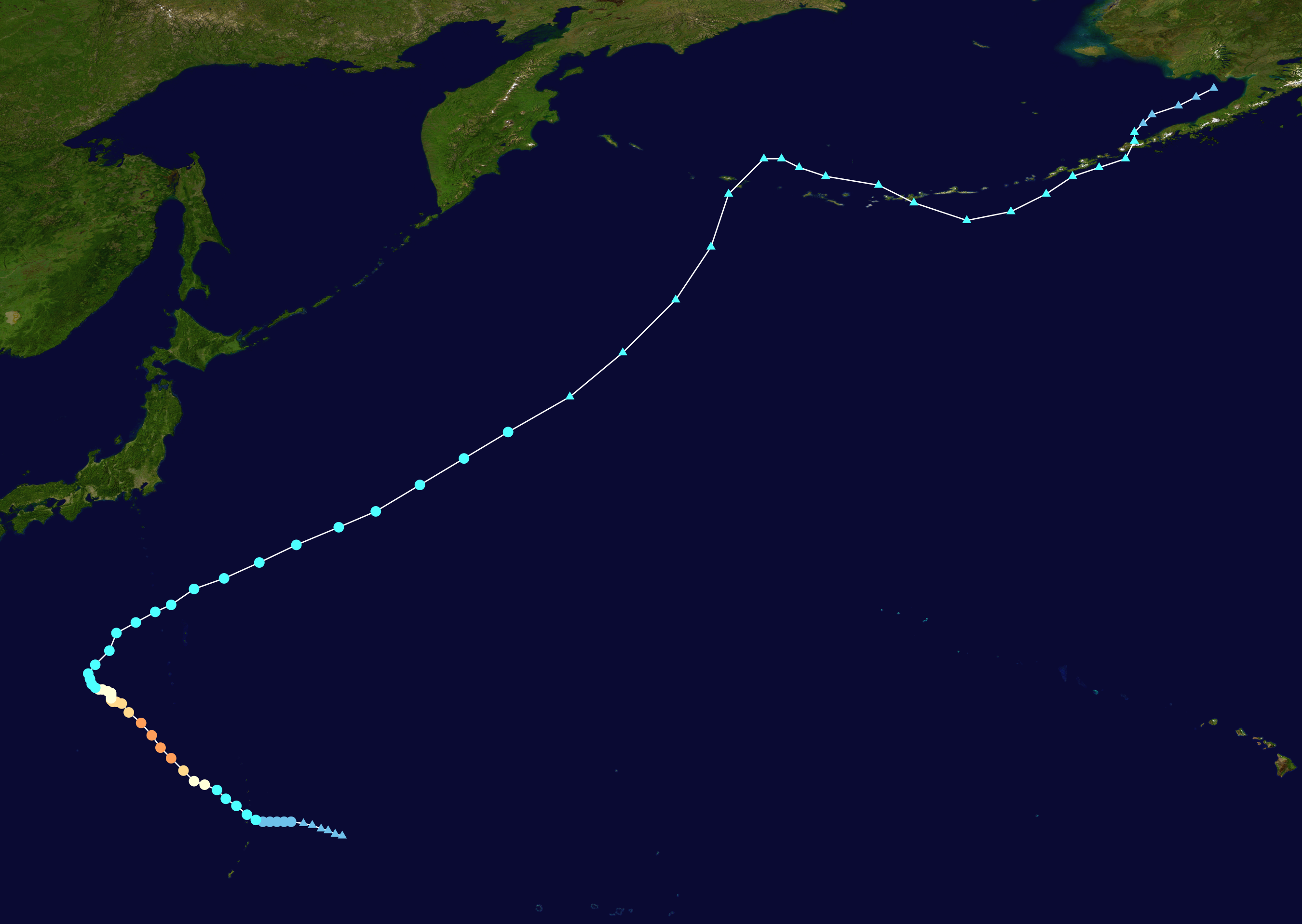
- Duration: September 22 – October 4
- Peak intensity: 140 km/h (85 mph) (10-min); 955 hPa (mbar)

Typhoon Ian began as broad and poorly organized tropical disturbance situated roughly 610 km (380 mi) east-northeast of Guam. At the time, the disturbance was embedded in the Western Pacific monsoon trough, which re-established itself after being disrupted by the previous tropical cyclone outbreak. Pressures in the area gradually fell start on September 21. Based on Dvorak classifications of T2.0/55 km/h (35 mph), the JMA and JTWC both classified the disturbance as a tropical depression early on September 23. At 18:00 UTC that day, both agencies upgraded the depression into Tropical Storm Ian. Tracking westward, Ian strengthened at a climatological rate of one T number per day. After Ian turned to the northwest, the JMA upgraded Ian into a severe tropical storm at 00:00 UTC on September 25. Despite lacking an inner core, Ian was believed to have attained typhoon intensity that same day by both the JTWC and JMA, and subsequently, entered a period of rapid deepening. The JTWC estimated that Ian deepened by 50 mph (80 km/h) over the next 24 hours. Data from the JTWC indicated that Ian peaked in intensity at 00:00 UTC on September 26, with winds of 200 km/h (125 mph). The JMA suggested, however, the Ian's peak was much lower, with winds of 135 km/h (85 mph). While leveling off in intensity, Ian's forward motion decreased as it tracked northward. The storm's slow motion caused the typhoon to upwell cold water, which contributed to a decrease in cloud top temperatures around the eye. On September 29, Ian began to recurve out to sea, in response to a shortwave trough passing north of the typhoon. The JMA downgraded Ian to a severe tropical storm that evening. The JTWC estimated that Ian transitioned into a subtropical cyclone on October 1, and the next day, Ian was downgraded into a tropical storm by the JMA. On October 4, Ian finally dissipated over 2,000 km (1,245 mi) to the east of Japan.

=== Tropical Depression 17W ===
- Tropical depression (JMA)
- Tropical depression (SSHWS)
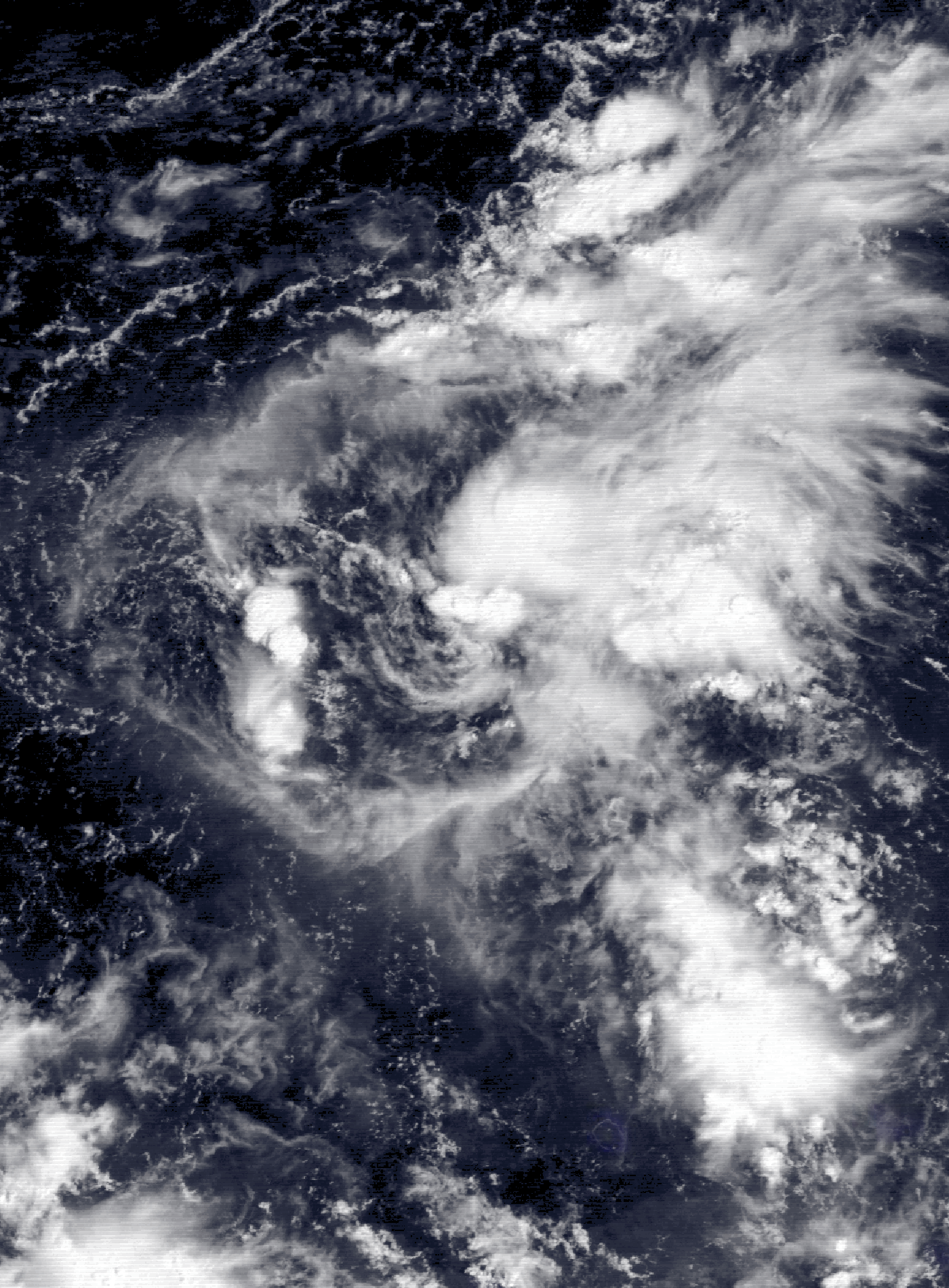
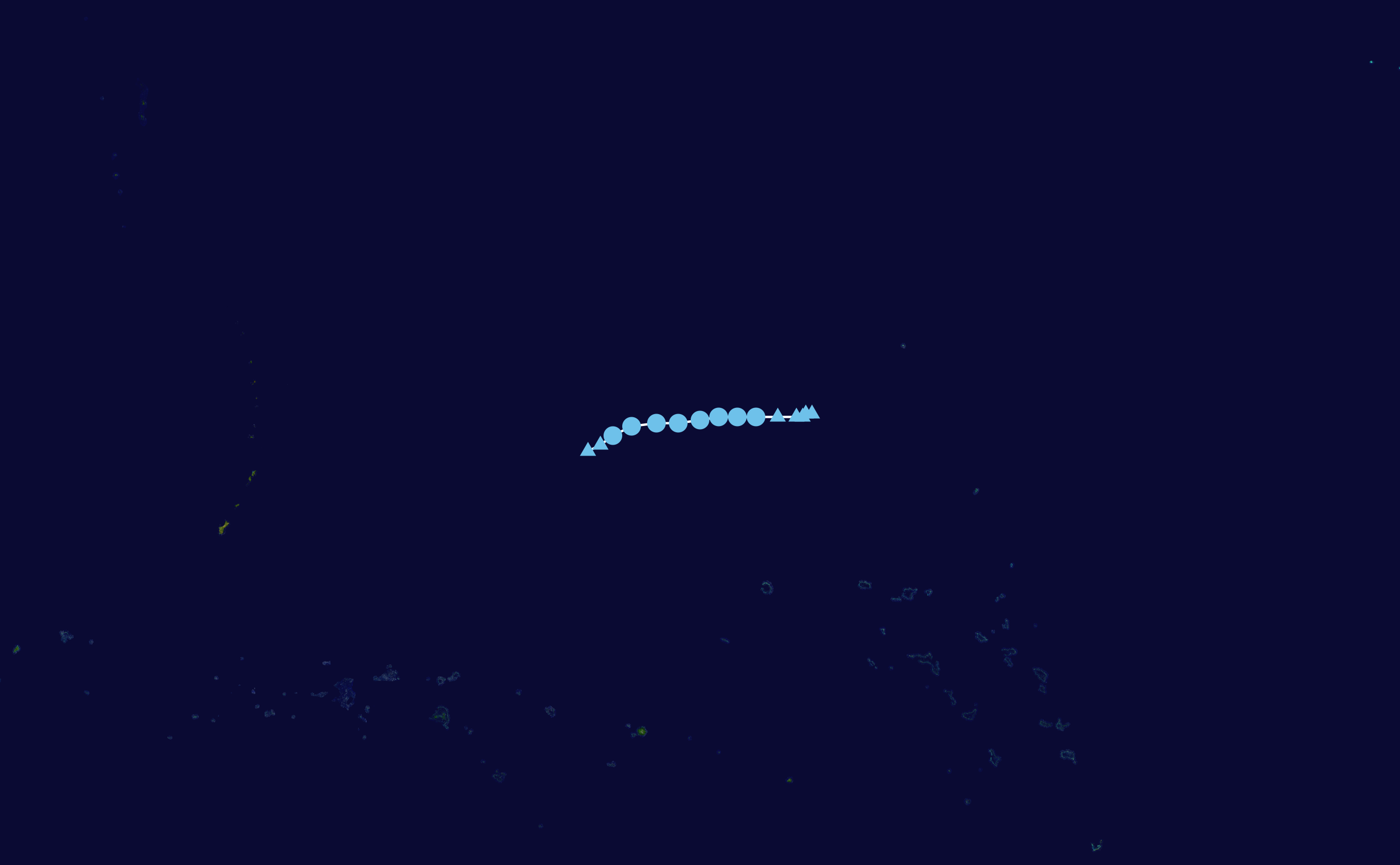
- Duration: September 25 – September 26
- Peak intensity: 55 km/h (35 mph) (1-min); 1006 hPa (mbar)

=== Typhoon Peke ===
- Typhoon (JMA)
- Category 3 typhoon (SSHWS)
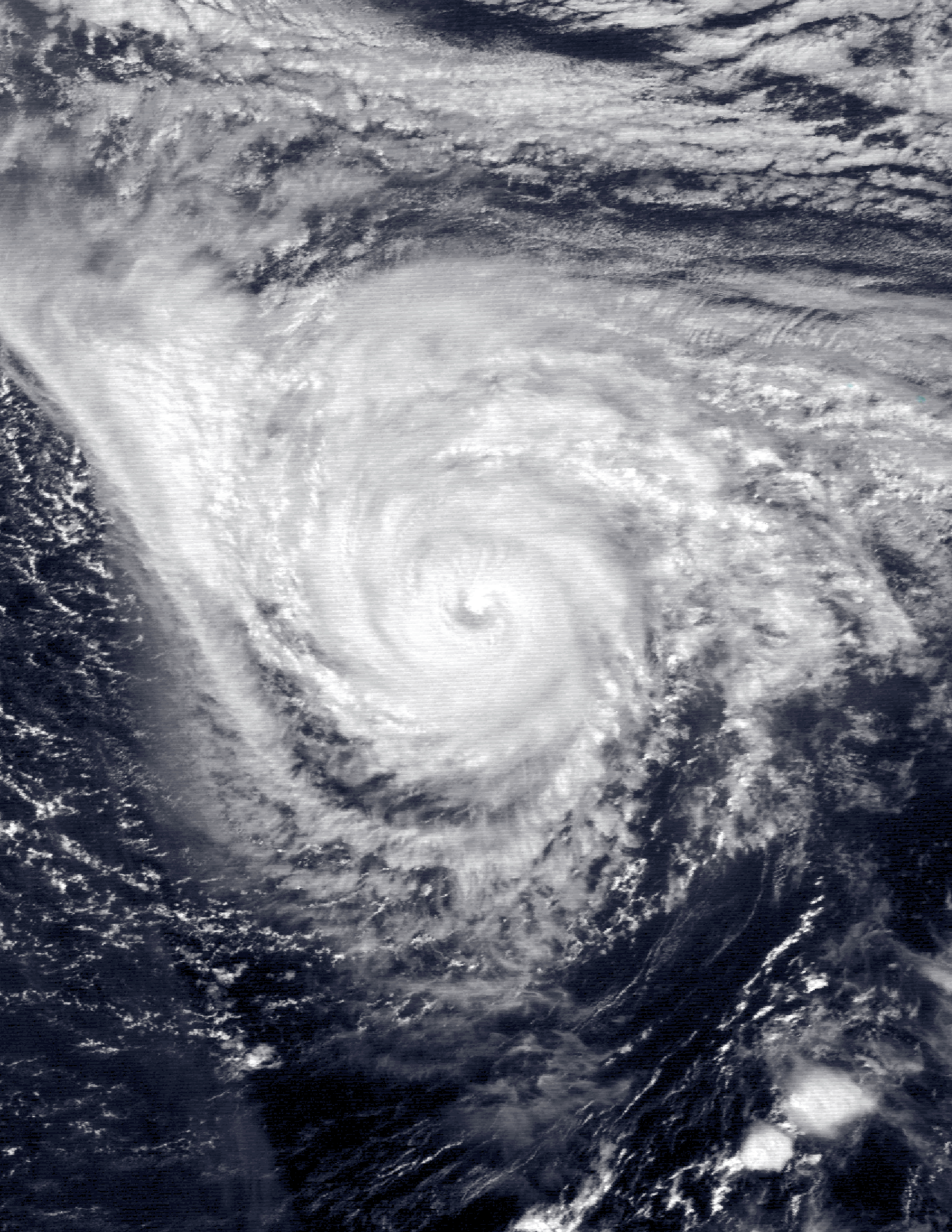
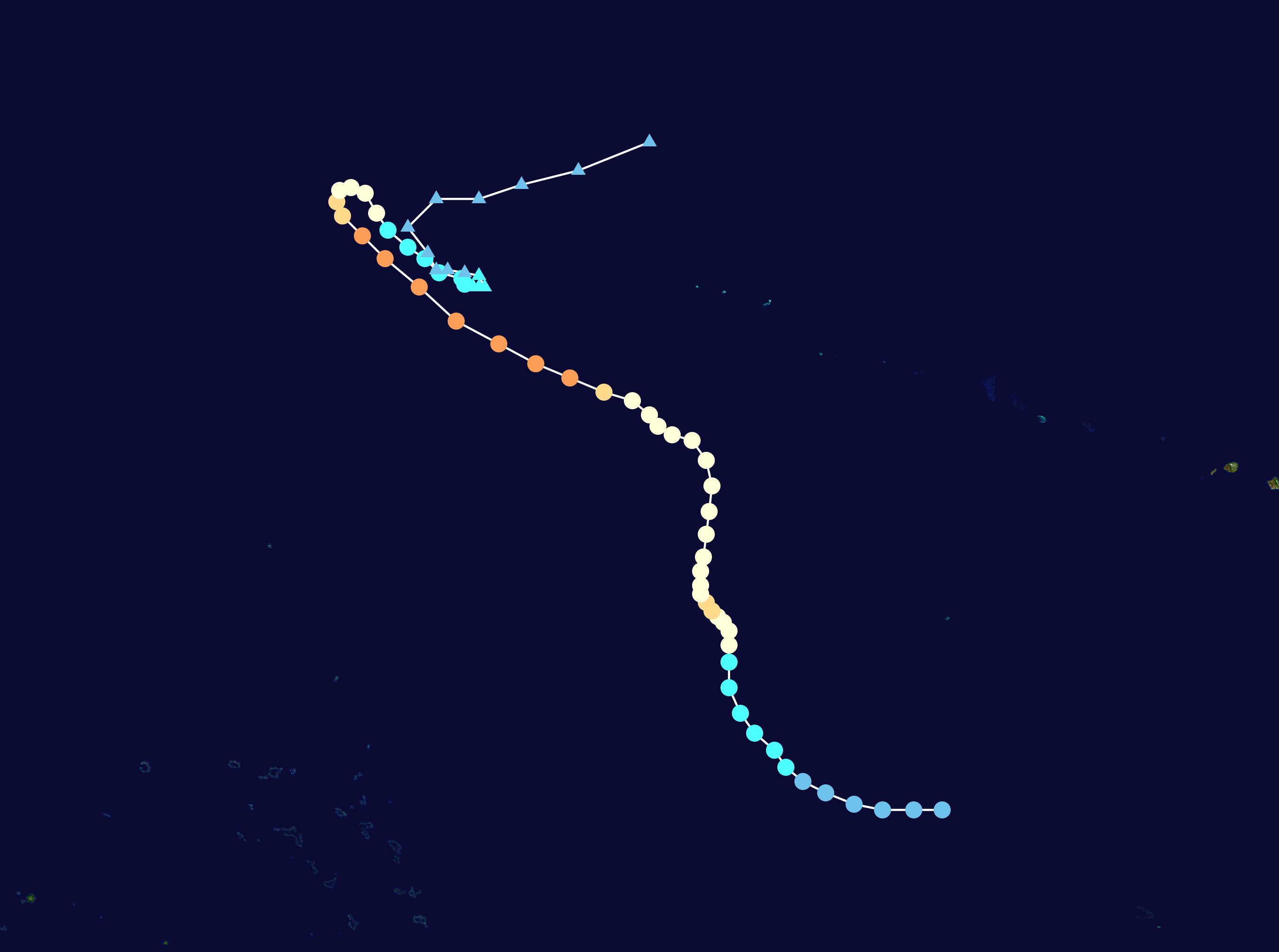
- Duration: September 28 (Entered basin) – October 3
- Peak intensity: 150 km/h (90 mph) (10-min); 950 hPa (mbar)

On September 28, Hurricane Peke crossed the International Date Line and was thus re-designated as Typhoon Peke at 00:00 UTC that day. At the time of crossing, the JMA estimated winds of 145 km/h (90 mph) while the JTWC estimated winds of 135 km/h (85 mph). In response to improved circus outflow, Peke steadily intensified, and early on September 29, the JTWC estimated that Peke reached its peak velocity, with winds of 115 mph (185 km/h); however, the JMA did not observe any strengthening. The typhoon began to encounter drier air, which prevented further intensification and caused the storm to become less organized. Midday on September 30, Peke began to decelerate as the storm started a weakening trend. After briefly becoming quasi-stationary, Peke veered to the north-northeast, only to drift back to the southeast as the storm's low- and mid-level centers diverged. The JTWC stopped tracking the system on October 3, although its remnants lingered for another three and half days due to collapsed steered currents. On October 7, the JMA ceased tracking Peke.

=== Tropical Storm June ===
- Tropical storm (JMA)
- Tropical storm (SSHWS)
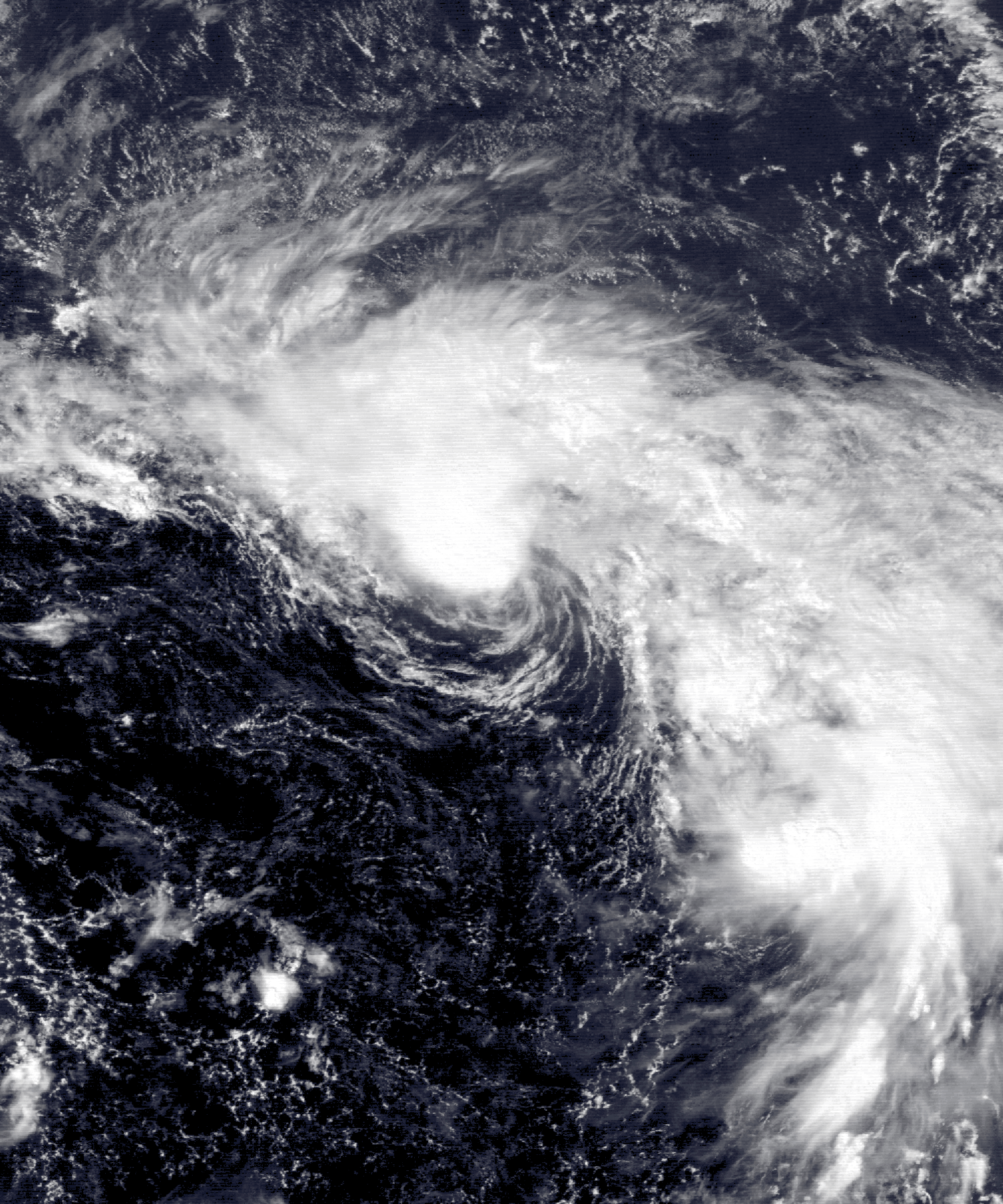
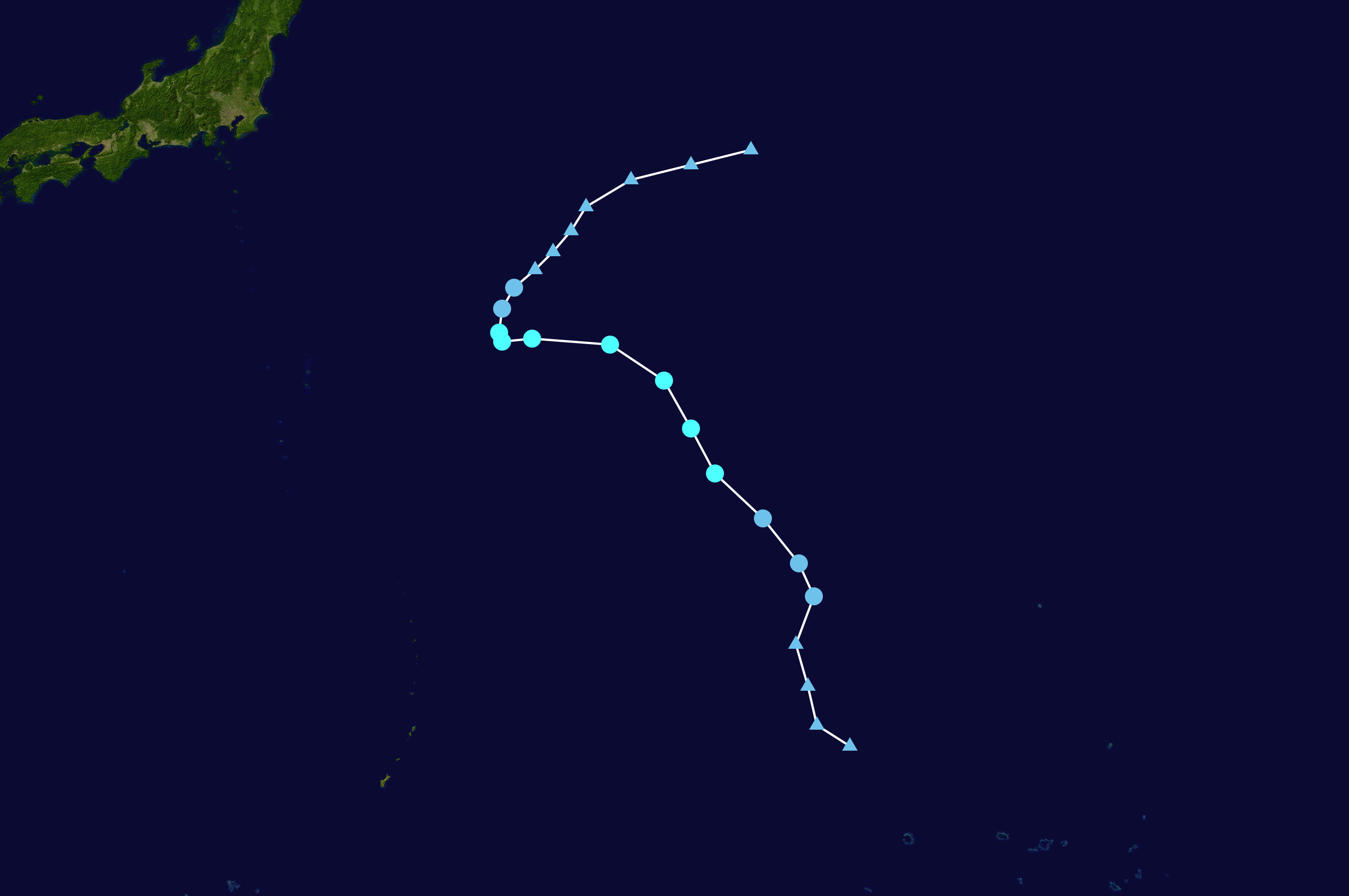
- Duration: September 27 – October 2
- Peak intensity: 85 km/h (50 mph) (10-min); 992 hPa (mbar)

The seventh and final tropical cyclone to form during the month of September, an area of disturbed weather developed on September 23 during the next four days, it failed to develop appreciably, but on September 28, the JMA classified the disturbance as a tropical depression. By September 30, shower and thunderstorm activity had increased considerably, prompting both the JTWC and JMA to upgrade the system into a tropical storm. However, June's close proximity to the more powerful Typhoon Ian restricted June's outflow and inhibited further strengthening. Increased vertical wind shear caused the low-level center to become detached from the shower and thunderstorm activity and the JTWC issued their final warning on system at 00:00 UTC on October 1. Despite this, the JMA estimated that June attained its peak intensity of 70 km/h (45 mph) around this time. The JMA finally downgraded June into a tropical depression on October 2. The JMA stopped tracking the system altogether that evening.

=== Typhoon Kelly (Oniang) ===
- Typhoon (JMA)
- Category 2 typhoon (SSHWS)
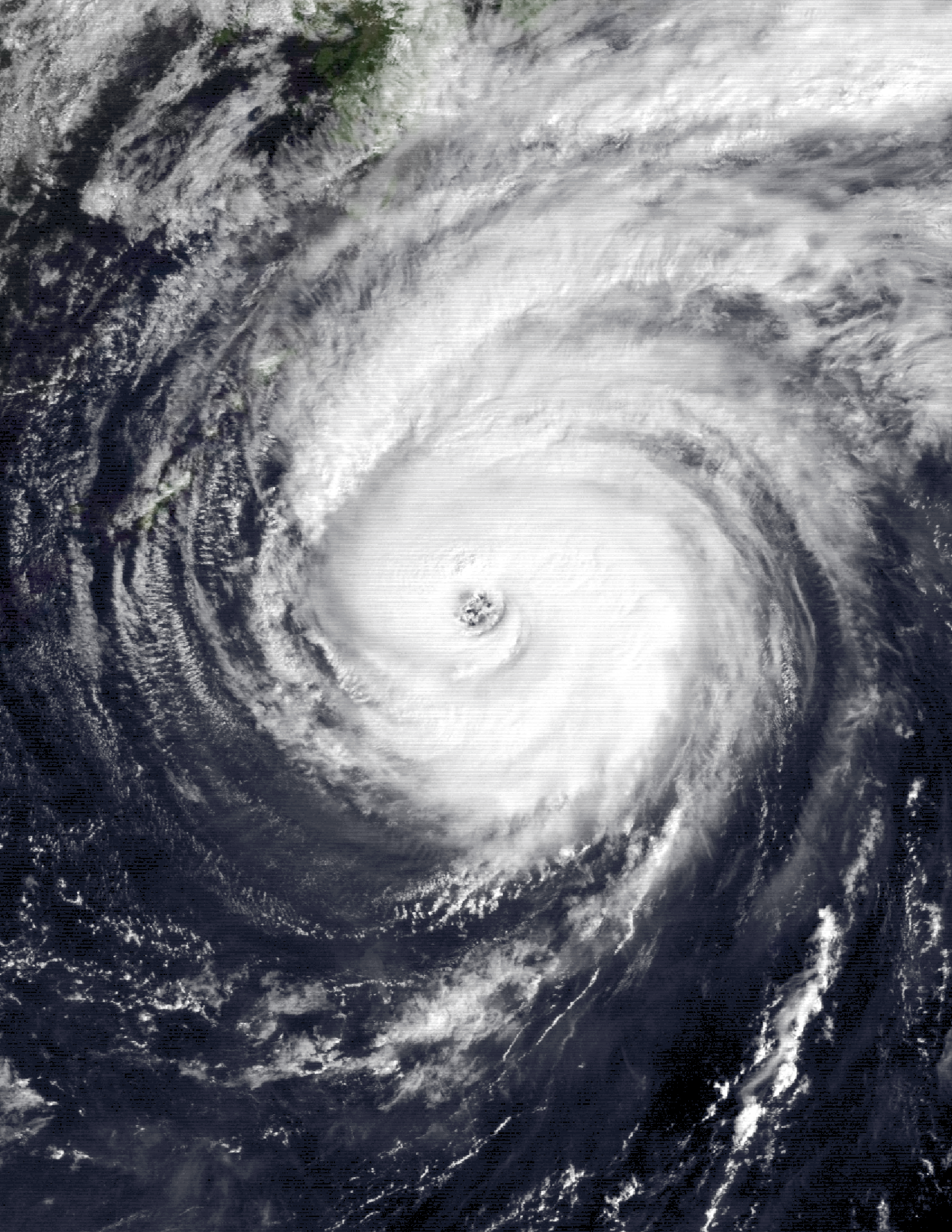
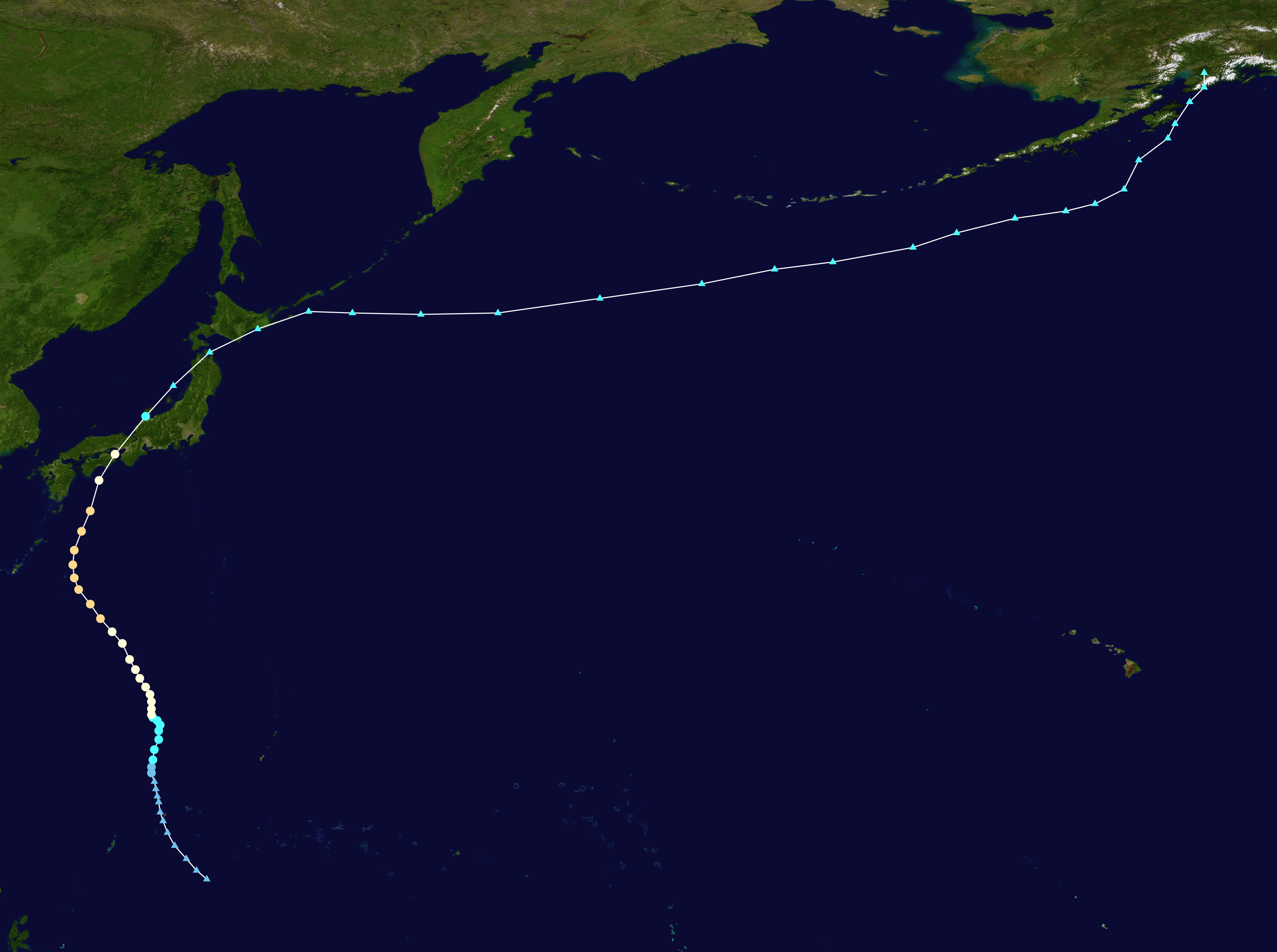
- Duration: October 9 – October 17
- Peak intensity: 140 km/h (85 mph) (10-min); 955 hPa (mbar)

A tropical disturbance formed east of the southern Philippines on October 7. Moving north-northwest for much of its life cycle, the system became a tropical depression and strengthened into a tropical storm on October 11 and a typhoon on October 12. Recurving near the 26th parallel, Kelly struck southern Japan as a typhoon early on October 17 and rapidly transitioned into an extratropical cyclone later that day in the Sea of Japan. On Shikoku Island Kelly dropped 20 inches (510 mm) of rain, resulting floods and landslides killed 9 people.

=== Typhoon Lynn (Pepang) ===
- Violent typhoon (JMA)
- Category 5 super typhoon (SSHWS)
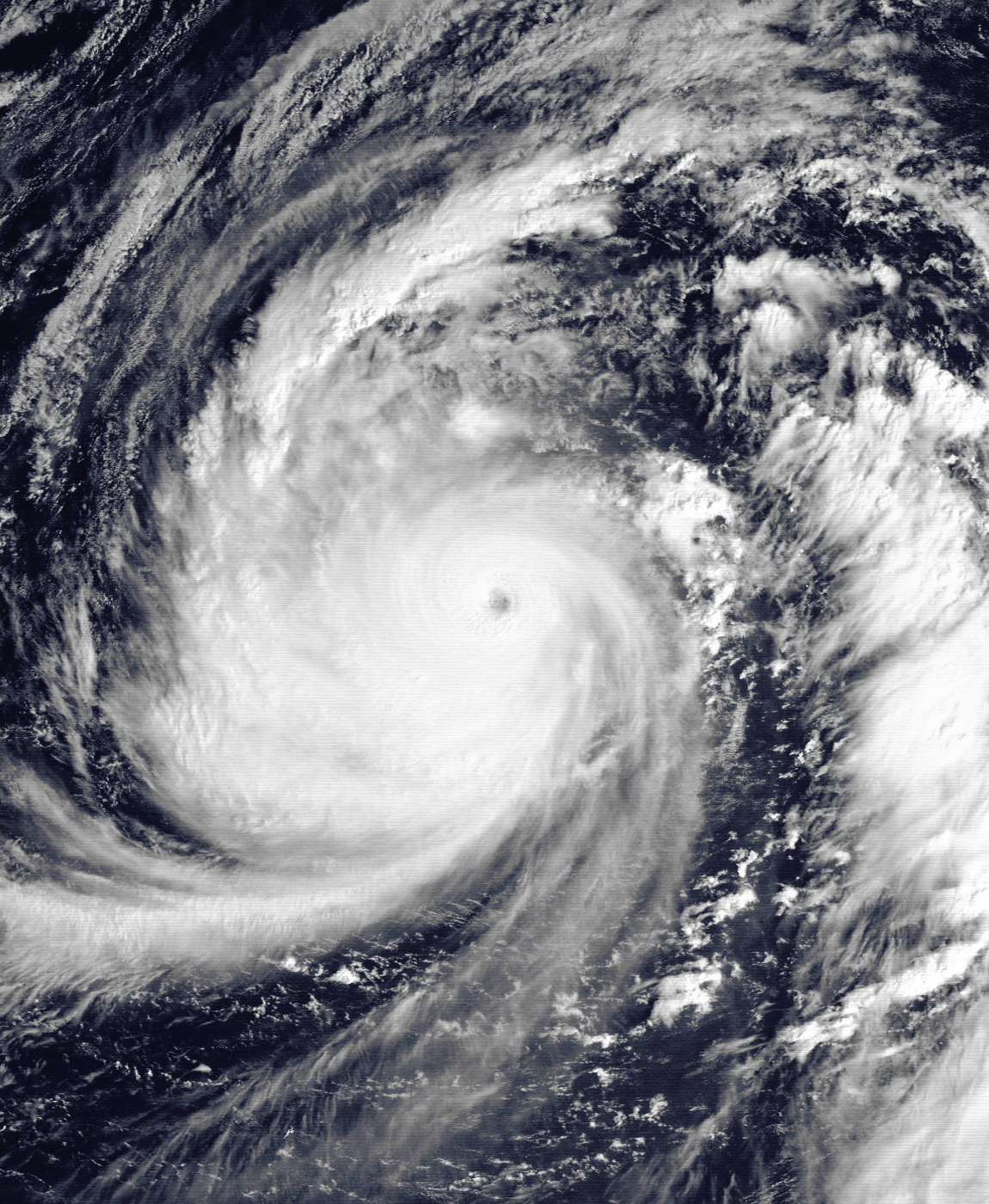
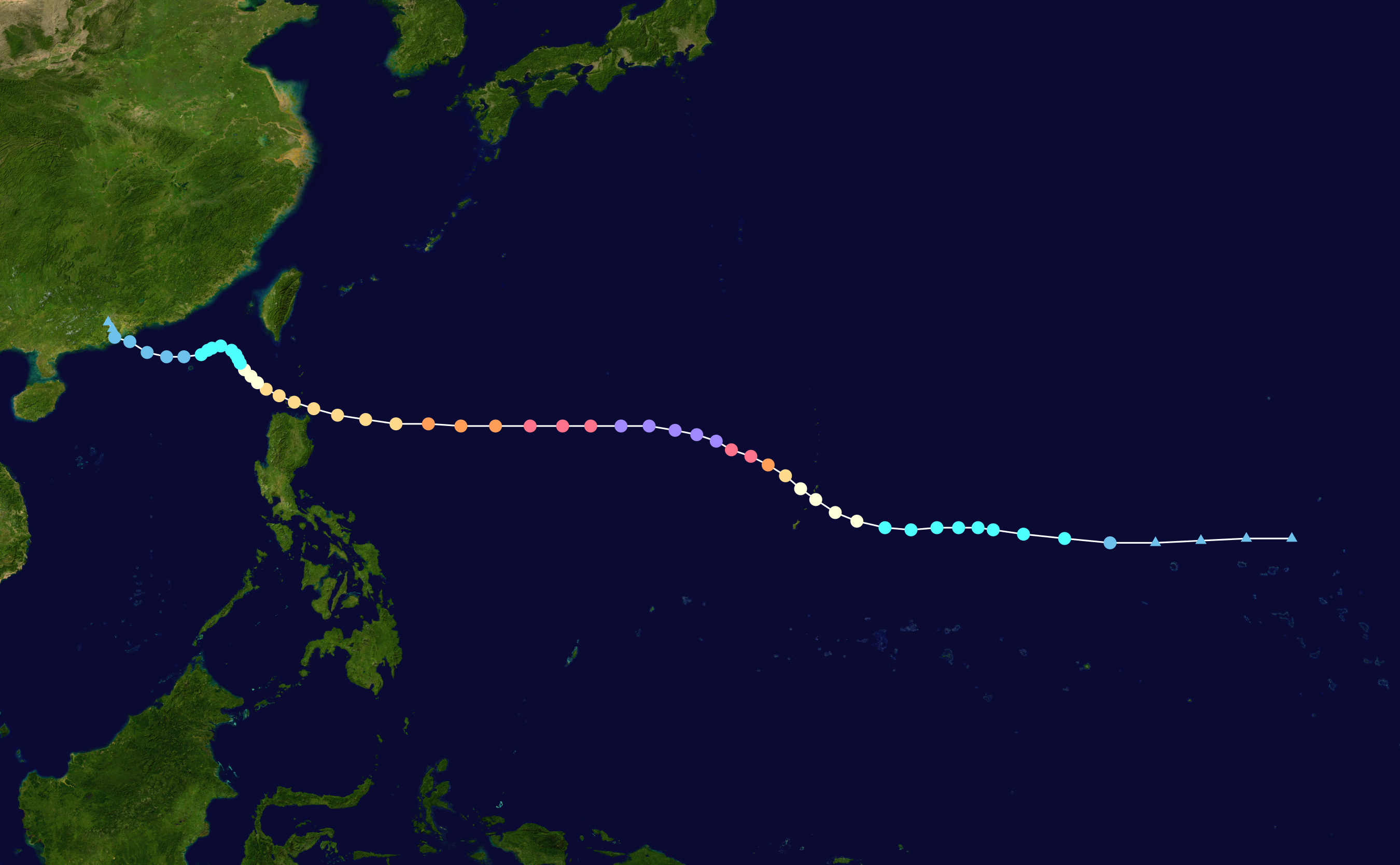
- Duration: October 14 – October 28
- Peak intensity: 195 km/h (120 mph) (10-min); 920 hPa (mbar)

Typhoon Lynn, having developed from the monsoon trough on October 15 over the open ocean, rapidly intensified to a 160 mph (260 km/h) super typhoon on the 19th and 20th. It crossed through the Mariana Islands, and steadily weakened as it continued westward. Lynn passed just north of Luzon on the 23rd, and upper-level winds weakened it to a tropical depression before it hit southern China on the 28th. Lynn's tight pressure gradient, in combination with a large high pressure area over China, caused heavy winds over Taiwan, resulting in the formation of torrential rains of up to 68 inches (1,700 mm) in Taipei. Seven people were killed in the Philippines, while another 42 people perished in Taiwan from the extreme flooding, the worst for the island in 40 years.

=== Tropical Storm Maury (Rosing) ===
- Tropical storm (JMA)
- Tropical storm (SSHWS)
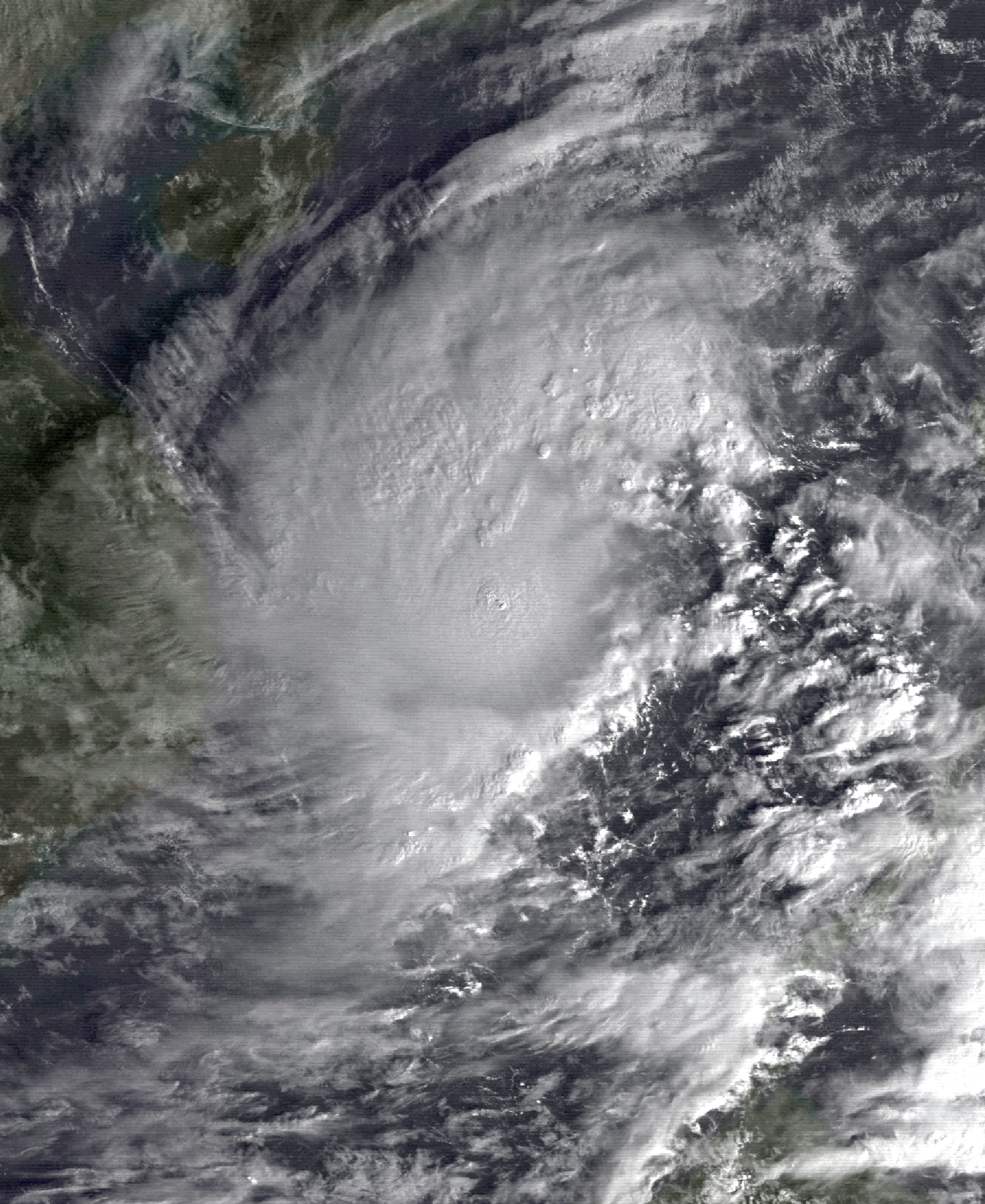
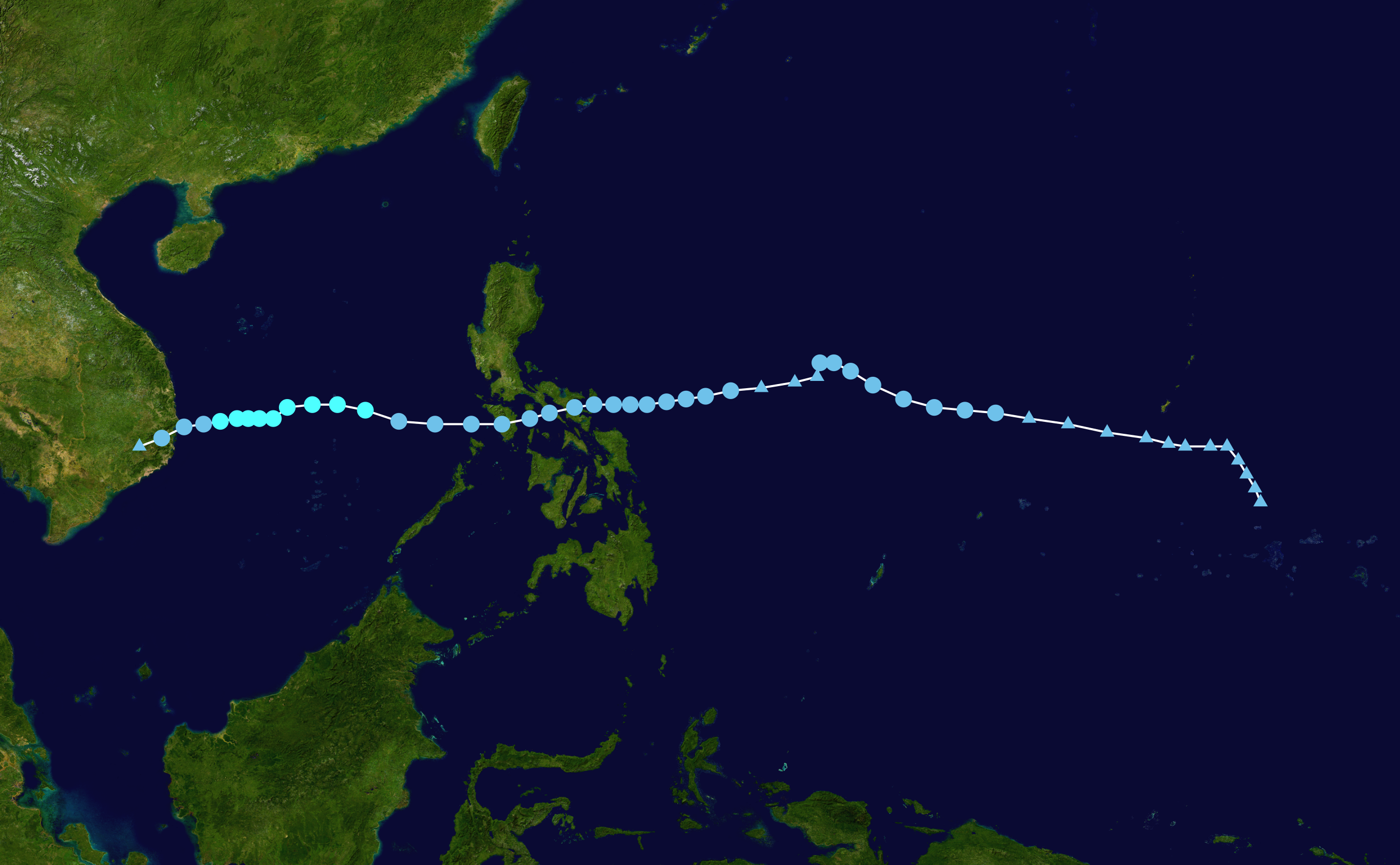
- Duration: November 7 – November 19
- Peak intensity: 85 km/h (50 mph) (10-min); 994 hPa (mbar)

Tropical Storm Maury first formed from an area of disturbed weather early on November 7. At the time, the disturbance had a well-defined surface circulation and persistent deep convection, but little development was expected due to strong wind shear aloft. The storm failed to develop further initially, but on November 10, the storm's convective cloud structure improved, and on November 11, the JTWC upgraded the system into a tropical depression. The depression quickly lost organization due to strong wind shear, and at 00:00 UTC on November 12, the JTWC issued its last warning on the system. Early on November 13, the JTWC reported that the depression had regenerated while the JMA upgraded the depression at around this time. Tracking westward, the depression decreased in organization as it approached the Philippines. The depression maintained its intensity over the Philippines and on November 15, entered the South China Sea. Following a significant increase in the storm's deep convection, the JTWC upgraded the depression into Tropical Storm Maury midday on November 16, with the JMA doing the same six hours later. On November 17, both agencies estimated that Maury reached its peak intensity of 50 mph (80 km/h). The JMA downgraded Maury into a depression on November 18, and after moving onshore near Cam Ranh Bay at 04:00 UTC on November 19, Maury dissipated two hours later. Widespread flooding was reported in Vietnam. 86 people were killed and damages totaled to more than US$20 million.

=== Typhoon Nina (Sisang) ===
- Very strong typhoon (JMA)
- Category 5 super typhoon (SSHWS)
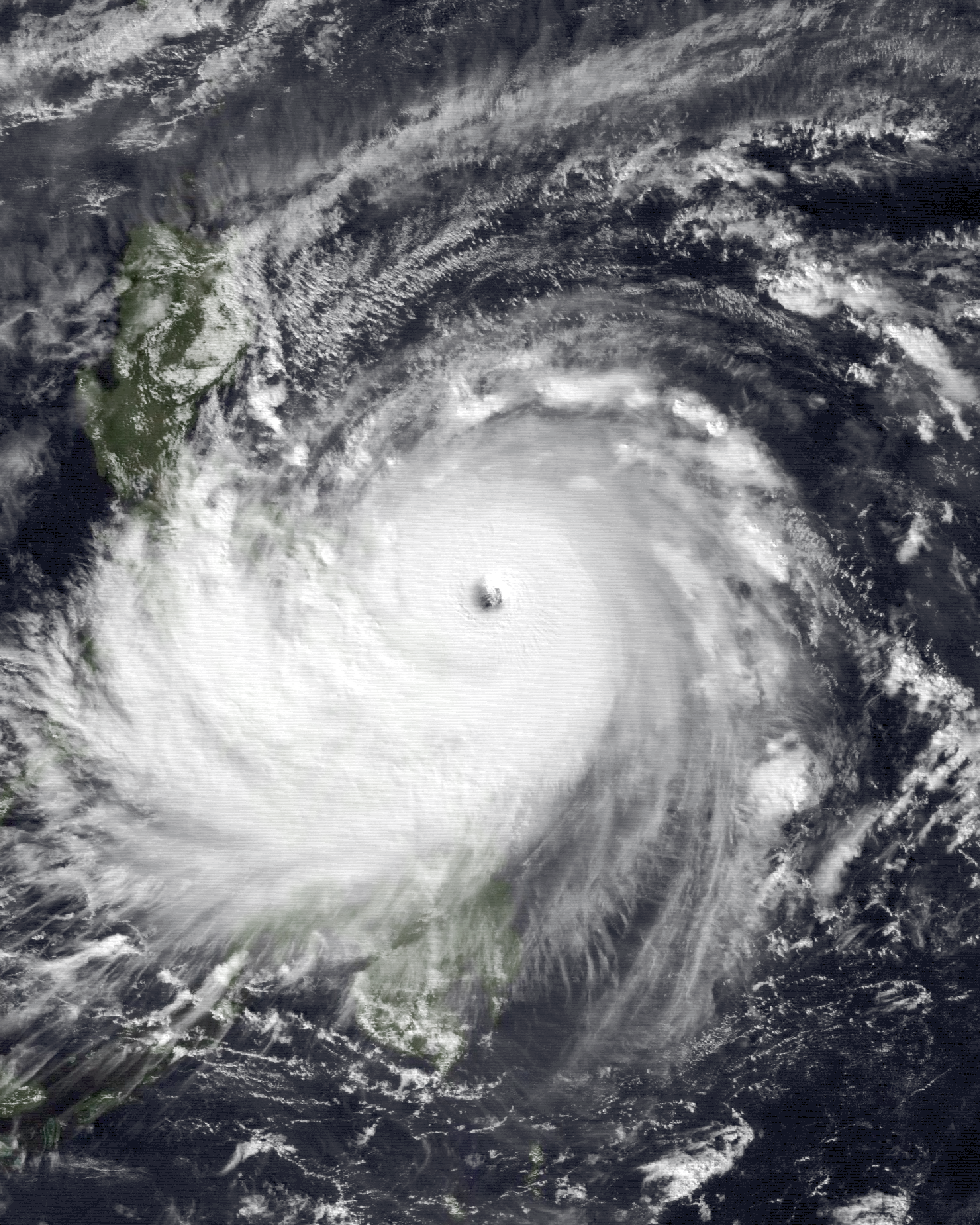
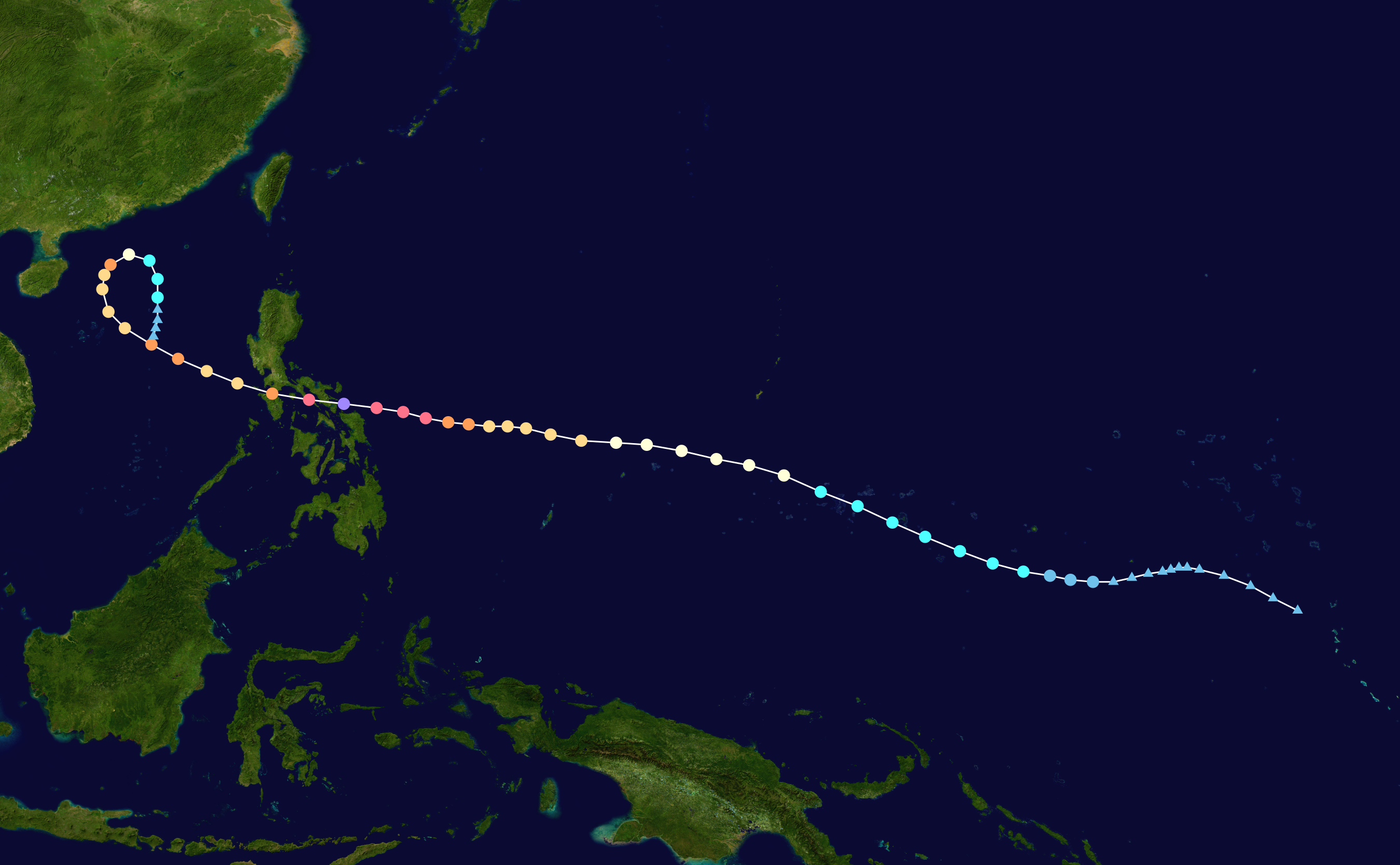
- Duration: November 16 – November 30
- Peak intensity: 165 km/h (105 mph) (10-min); 930 hPa (mbar)

Tropical Storm Nina, which began its life on November 16 in the eastern portion of the Western Pacific Ocean, slowly strengthened to a typhoon on the 21st. It continued to strengthen as it passed through the Caroline Islands, and reached super typhoon strength on the 25th just east of the Philippines. Nina continued to intensify, and reached a peak of 165 mph (266 km/h) winds just before hitting the central Philippines on the evening of the 25th. Nina exited the archipelago the next day as a 105 mph (169 km/h) typhoon. Nina briefly re-strengthened to a 115 mph (185 km/h) typhoon before turning to the north. The typhoon briefly threatened Hong Kong on the 28th, but vertical shear caused the low level circulation and upper-level circulation to separate, leaving a rapidly weakening Nina to turn southward over the South China Sea. The storm finally dissipated on the 30th, but not after causing 1,036 casualties and extensive crop damage on its path of 1.12 billion Philippine Pesos (1987 pesos).

=== Tropical Depression Ogden ===
- Tropical depression (JMA)
- Tropical storm (SSHWS)
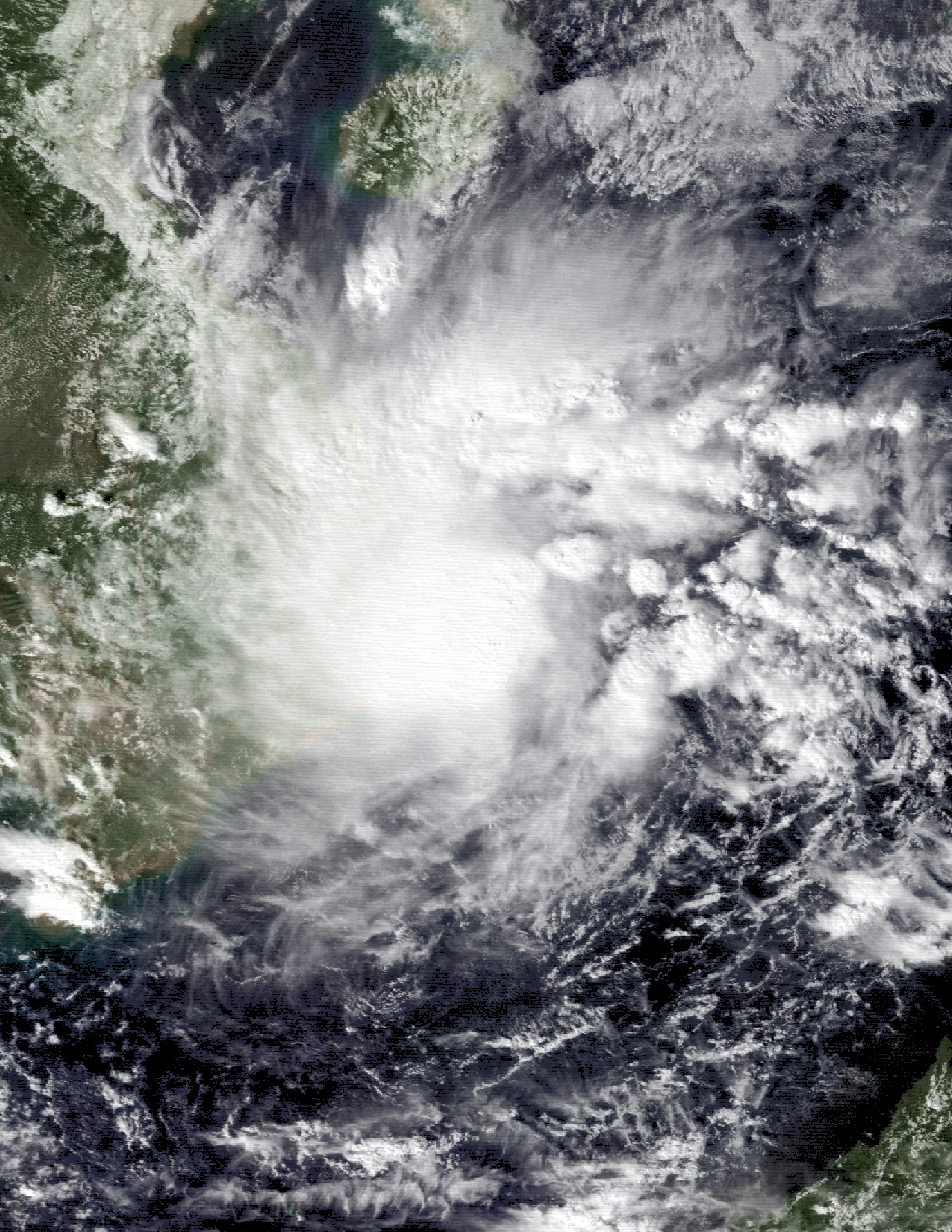
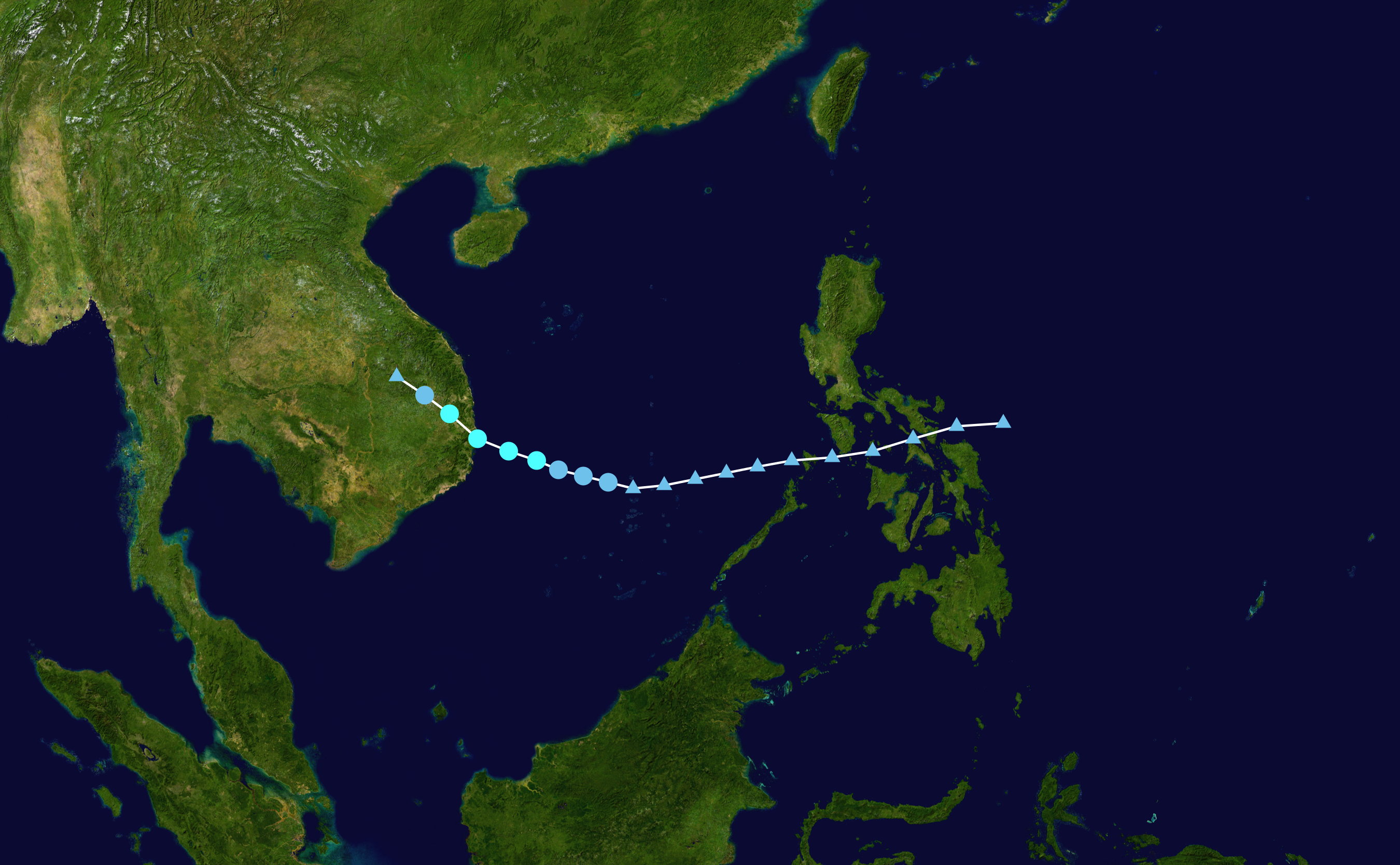
- Duration: November 23 – November 25
- Peak intensity: 85 km/h (50 mph) (1-min); 1002 hPa (mbar)

A poorly organized area of convection formed east of the Philippines and moved westward over the next few days. The tropical disturbance crossed the Philippines and was named Ogden on the 24th in the South China Sea. Ogden made landfall over Tuy Hòa, Vietnam later that day. It moved inland and dissipated the next day.

=== Typhoon Phyllis (Trining) ===
- Typhoon (JMA)
- Category 3 typhoon (SSHWS)
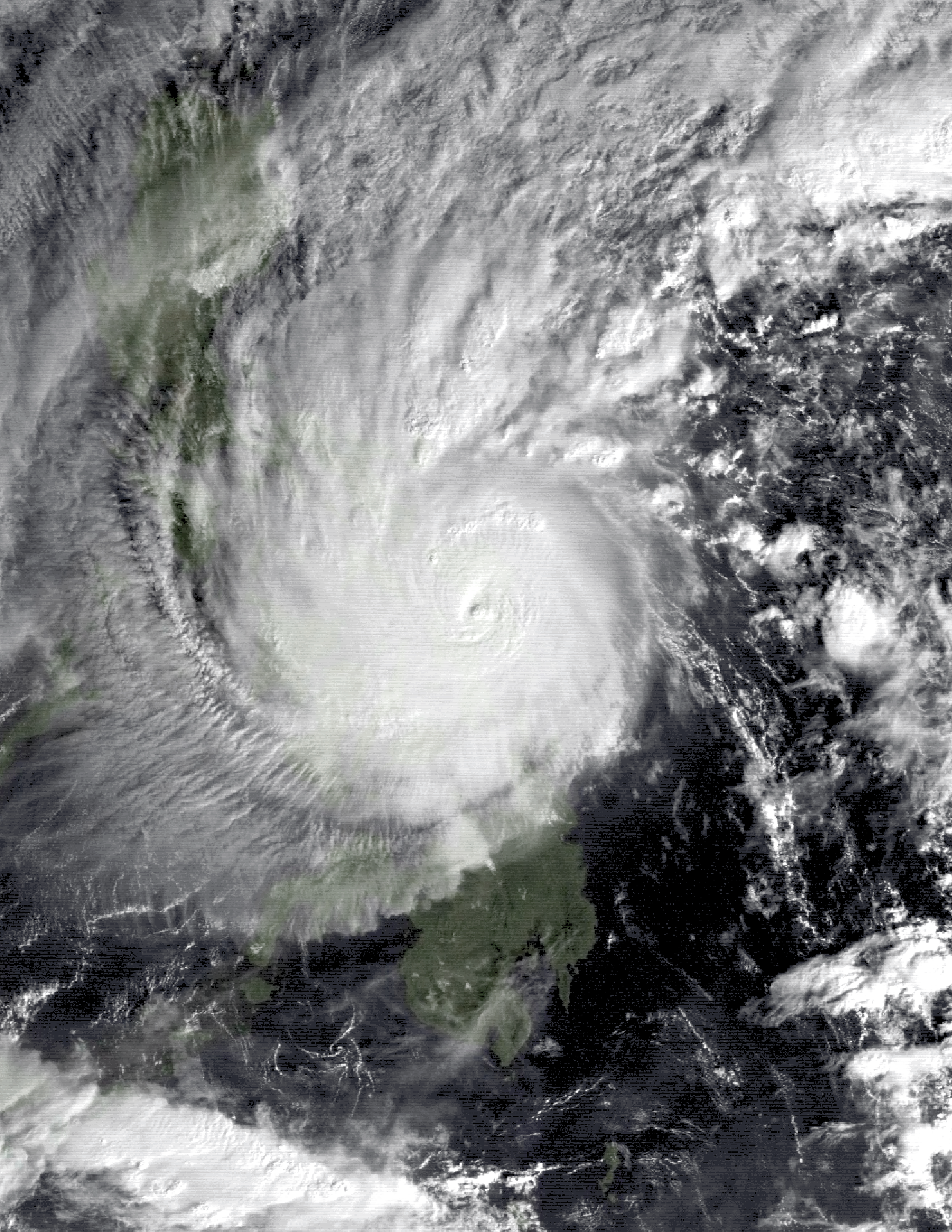
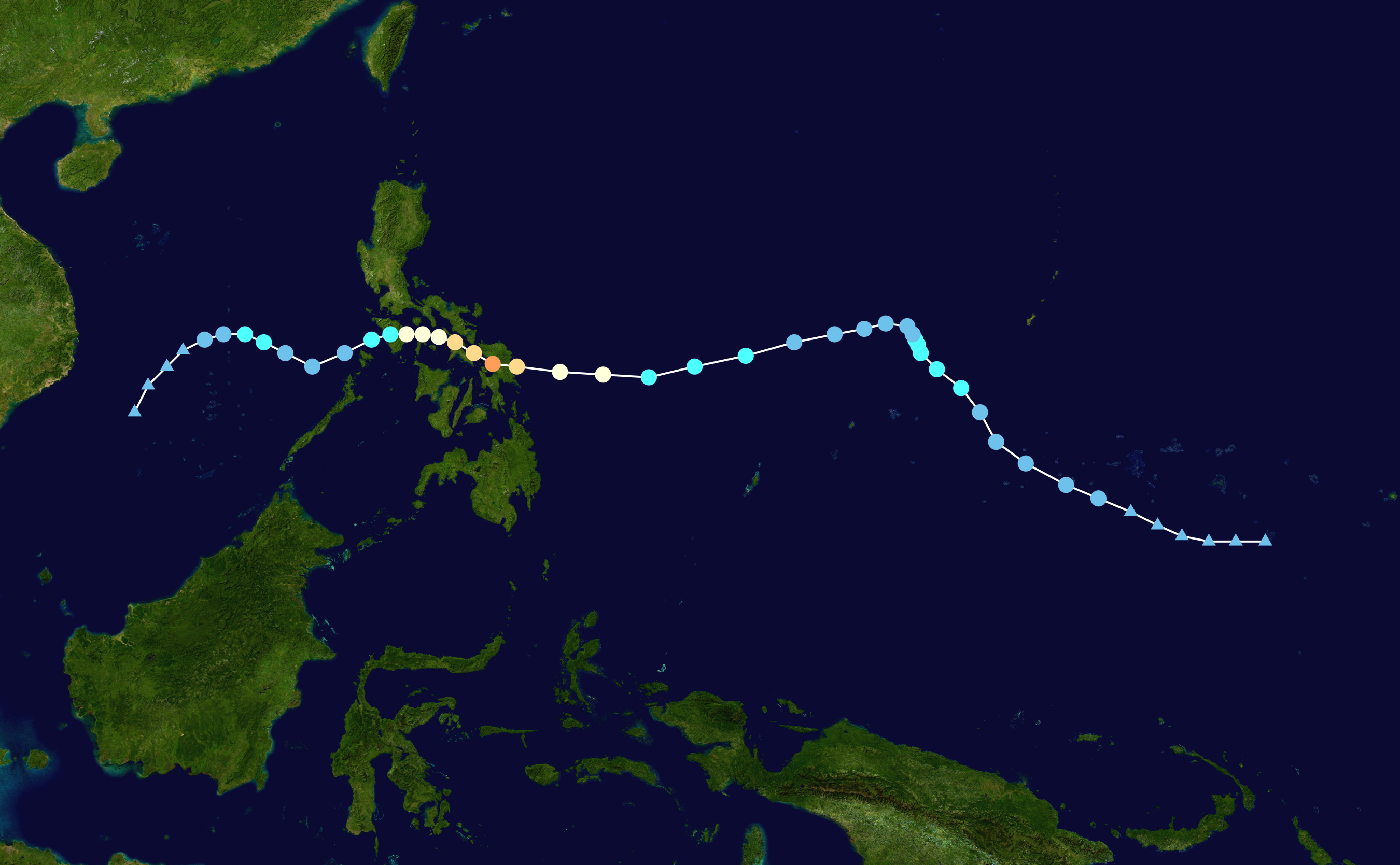
- Duration: December 9 – December 20
- Peak intensity: 140 km/h (85 mph) (10-min); 960 hPa (mbar)

Affecting the Philippines three weeks after Typhoon Nina devastated the archipelago, Typhoon Phyllis prompted typhoon alerts for the Visayans. Offshore northern Samar Island, a ferry boat carrying 50 people sank, though 27 were rescued, the bodies of 10 drowning victims were recovered and 13 others were feared dead.

== Storm names ==
During the season 23 named tropical cyclones developed in the Western Pacific and were named by the Joint Typhoon Warning Center, when it was determined that they had become tropical storms. These names were contributed to a revised list from 1979.

Orchid	Percy	Ruth	Sperry	Thelma	Vernon	Wynne	Alex	Betty	Cary	Dinah	Ed
Freda	Gerald	Holly	Ian	June	Kelly	Lynn	Maury	Nina	Ogden	Phyllis	

=== Philippines ===
Auring	Bebeng	Katring	Diding	Etang
Gening	Herming	Ising	Luding	Mameng
Neneng	Oniang	Pepang	Rosing	Sisang
Trining	Uring (unused)	Warling (unused)	Yayang (unused)	
Auxiliary list
				Ading (unused)
Barang (unused)	Krising (unused)	Dadang (unused)	Erling (unused)	Goying (unused)

The Philippine Atmospheric, Geophysical and Astronomical Services Administration uses its own naming scheme for tropical cyclones in their area of responsibility. PAGASA assigns names to tropical depressions that form within their area of responsibility and any tropical cyclone that might move into their area of responsibility. Should the list of names for a given year prove to be insufficient, names are taken from an auxiliary list, the first 6 of which are published each year before the season starts. Names not retired from this list will be used again in the 1991 season. This is the same list used for the 1983 season. PAGASA uses its own naming scheme that starts in the Filipino alphabet, with names of Filipino female names ending with "ng" (A, B, K, D, etc.). Names that were not assigned/going to use are marked in gray.

=== Retirement ===
Owing to their extensive damage and death toll within the Philippines, the PAGASA later retired the names Herming and Sisang. Replaced names were selected as Helming and Sendang for the 1991 season. The name Katring, which replaced Karing in 1983 for still unknown reasons, was removed from this list (List I). It was previously included in another list (List IV) as an auxiliary name, replacing Kading which was retired after the 1978 season. Because of this, the name Karing was reinstated in this list for the 1991 season.

== Season effects ==
This is a table of all of the storms that have formed in the 1987 Pacific typhoon season. It includes their duration, names, affected areas, damages, and death totals. Deaths in parentheses are additional and indirect (an example of an indirect death would be a traffic accident), but were still related to that storm. Damage and deaths include totals while the storm was extratropical, a wave, or a low, and all of the damage figures are in 1986 USD. Names listed in parentheses were assigned by PAGASA.

Name	Dates	Peak intensity			Areas affected	Damage (USD)	Deaths	Ref(s).
Name	Dates	Category	Wind speed	Pressure	Areas affected	Damage (USD)	Deaths	Ref(s).
Orchid (Auring)	January 7–14	Very strong typhoon	165 km/h (103 mph)	955 hPa (28.20 inHg)	Caroline Islands	None	None	
Percy	April 6–16	Tropical storm	85 km/h (53 mph)	1,000 hPa (29.53 inHg)	Caroline Islands	None	None	
Ruth	June 17–20	Tropical storm	85 km/h (53 mph)	992 hPa (29.29 inHg)	South China	None	None	
TD	June 17–18	Tropical depression	Not specified	1,004 hPa (29.65 inHg)	Taiwan, Ryukyu Islands	None	None	
Sperry (Bebeng)	June 26 – July 1	Typhoon	120 km/h (75 mph)	980 hPa (28.94 inHg)	Caroline Islands	None	None	
Thelma (Katring)	July 7–16	Very strong typhoon	185 km/h (115 mph)	915 hPa (27.02 inHg)	Marshall Islands, Philippines, Taiwan, Japan, Korean Peninsula	$272 million	138	
Vernon (Diding)	July 16–22	Severe tropical storm	110 km/h (68 mph)	985 hPa (29/09 inHg)	Philippines, Taiwan	None	None	
Wynne (Gening)	July 21 – August 1	Very strong yphoon	185 km/h (115 mph)	920 hPa (27.17 inHg)	Marshall Islands, Mariana Islands, Japan	None	None	
Alex (Etang)	July 21–29	Typhoon	120 km/h (75 mph)	970 hPa (28.64 inHg)	Philippines, Taiwan	$1.8 million	126	
TD	August 5–6	Tropical depression	Not specified	1,004 hPa (29.65 inHg)	None	None	None	
TD	August 5–6	Tropical depression	Not specified	1,006 hPa (29.71 inHg)	None	None	None	
Betty (Herming)	August 8–17	Violent typhoon	205 km/h (127 mph)	890 hPa (26.28 inHg)	Philippines, Vietnam, Thailand	$100 million	92	
Ten	August 10–13	Tropical storm	65 km/h (40 mph)	1,006 hPa (29.71 inHg)	Japan	None	None	
Cary (Ising)	August 12–17	Typhoon	140 km/h (87 mph)	960 hPa (28.35 inHg)	Philippines, Vietnam, South China	$5.58 million	25	
TD	August 13–14	Tropical depression	Not specified	1,006 hPa (29.71 inHg)	None	None	None	
TD	August 18–21	Tropical depression	Not specified	1,008 hPa (29.77 inHg)	None	None	None	
Dinah (Luding)	August 20–31	Very strong typhoon	185 km/h (115 mph)	915 hPa (27.02 inHg)	Caroline Islands, Japan, South Korea	$679 million	40	
Ed	August 21–29	Tropical depression	65 km/h (40 mph)	1,006 hPa (29.71 inHg)	Caroline Islands	None	None	
Gerald (Neneng)	September 3–10	Typhoon	150 km/h (93 mph)	950 hPa (28.05 inHg)	Philippines, Taiwan, China	$135 million	127	
Mameng	September 3–5	Tropical depression	45 km/h (28 mph)	1,002 hPa (29.59 inHg)	Vietnam	None	None	
Freda	September 4–18	Violent typhoon	195 km/h (121 mph)	915 hPa (27.02 inHg)	Caroline Islands, Mariana Islands	None	None	
Holly	September 5–17	Violent typhoon	205 km/h (127 mph)	900 hPa (26.58 inHg)	Marshall Islands	None	None	
Ian	September 23 – October 4	Typhoon	140 km/h (87 mph)	955 hPa (28.20 inHg)	Mariana Islands	None	None	
17W	September 25–26	Tropical depression	55 km/h (34 mph)	1,006 hPa (29.71 inHg)	None	None	None	
Peke	September 28 – October 6	Typhoon	150 km/h (93 mph)	950 hPa (28.05 inHg)	None	None	None	
June	September 28 – October 2	Tropical storm	85 km/h (53 mph)	992 hPa (29.29 inHg)	None	None	None	
Kelly (Oniang)	October 9–17	Typhoon	140 km/h (87 mph)	955 hPa (28.20 inHg)	Japan	$366 million	8	
Lynn (Pepang)	October 15–28	Violent typhoon	195 km/h (121 mph)	920 hPa (27.17 inHg)	Mariana Islands, Philippines, Taiwan, South China	$32.3 million	49	
Maury (Rosing)	November 13–19	Tropical storm	85 km/h (53 mph)	994 hPa (29.35 inHg)	Philippines, Vietnam	$20 million	86	
Nina (Sisang)	November 19–30	Very strong typhoon	165 km/h (103 mph)	930 hPa (27.46 inHg)	Caroline Islands, Philippines, South China	$84.5 million	912	
Ogden	November 23–25	Tropical depression	85 km/h (53 mph)	1,002 hPa (29.59 inHg)	Vietnam	None	None	
Phyllis (Trining)	December 11–20	Typhoon	140 km/h (87 mph)	960 hPa (28.35 inHg)	Caroline Islands, Philippines	None	13	
Season aggregates
32 systems	January 7 – December 20, 1987		205 km/h (127 mph)	890 hPa (26.28 inHg)		>$1.31 billion	1,404	

== See also ==
- List of Pacific typhoon seasons
- 1987 Pacific hurricane season
- 1987 Atlantic hurricane season
- 1987 North Indian Ocean cyclone season
- Australian cyclone seasons: 1986–87, 1987–88
- South Pacific cyclone seasons: 1986–87, 1987–88
- South-West Indian Ocean cyclone seasons: 1986–87, 1987–88
