= Pacific typhoon season =

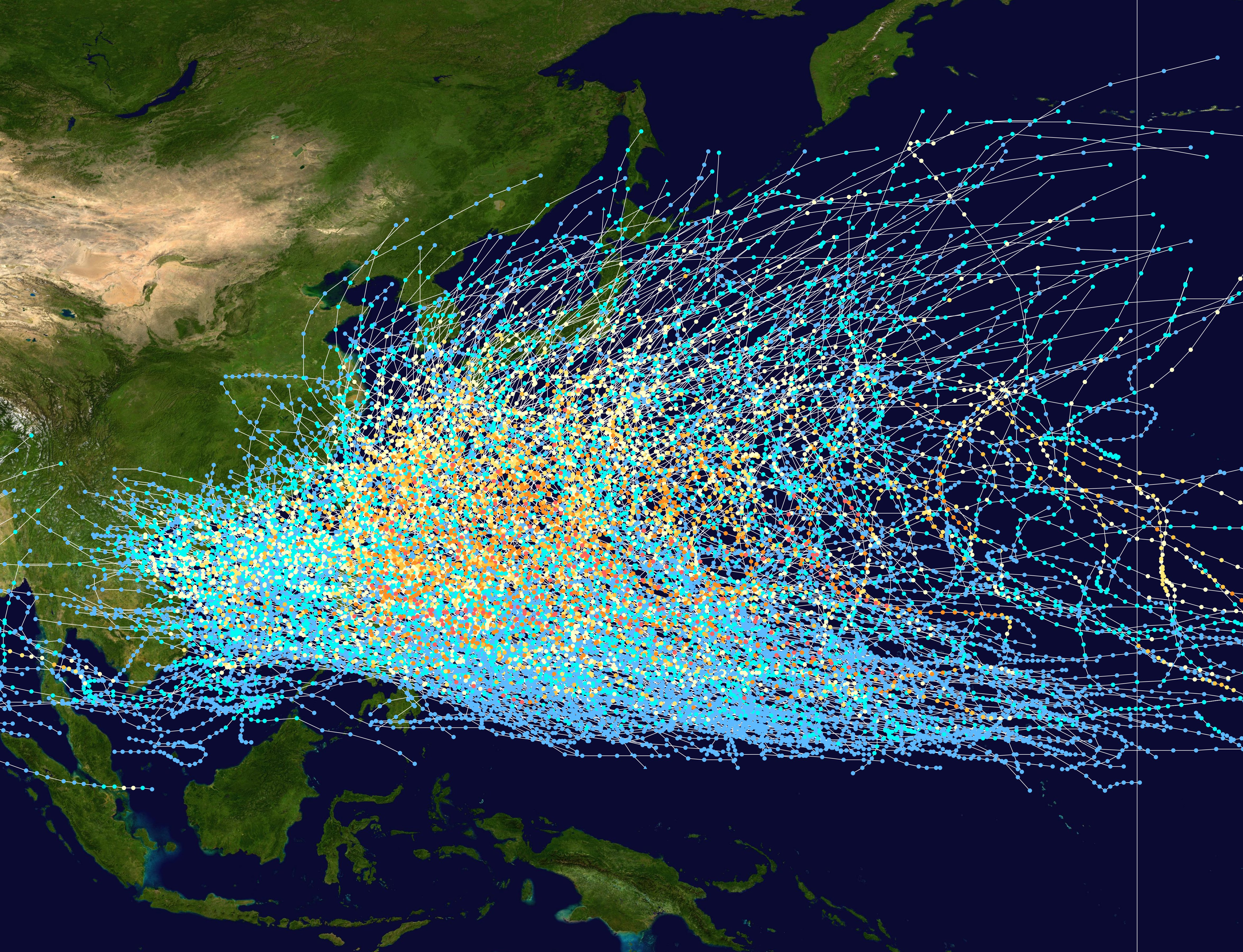
Tracks of all tropical cyclones in the northwestern Pacific Ocean between 1980 and 2005. The vertical line to the right is the Prime Antimeridian, which corresponds in part to the International Date Line.

Cumulative track map of all tropical cyclones in the northwestern Pacific Ocean from 1951 to 2026. The map includes the Prime Antimeridian and the Philippine Area of Responsibility lines. It contains the Japan Metrological Agency's tropical cyclone intensity scale.

The following is a list of Pacific typhoon seasons. The typhoon seasons are limited to the north of the equator between the 100th meridian east and the 180th meridian (aka Prime Antimeridian).

Period	Seasons
Pre-1900	List of Pacific typhoons before 1850, 1850s, 1860s, 1870s, 1880s, 1890s
1900s	1900, 1901, 1902, 1903, 1904, 1905, 1906, 1907, 1908, 1909
1910s	1910, 1911, 1912, 1913, 1914, 1915, 1916, 1917, 1918, 1919
1920s	1920, 1921, 1922, 1923, 1924, 1925, 1926, 1927, 1928, 1929
1930s	1930, 1931, 1932, 1933, 1934, 1935, 1936, 1937, 1938, 1939
1940s	1940, 1941, 1942, 1943, 1944, 1945, 1946, 1947, 1948, 1949
1950s	1950, 1951, 1952, 1953, 1954, 1955, 1956, 1957, 1958, 1959
1960s	1960, 1961, 1962, 1963, 1964, 1965, 1966, 1967, 1968, 1969
1970s	1970, 1971, 1972, 1973, 1974, 1975, 1976, 1977, 1978, 1979
1980s	1980, 1981, 1982, 1983, 1984, 1985, 1986, 1987, 1988, 1989
1990s	1990, 1991, 1992, 1993, 1994, 1995, 1996, 1997, 1998, 1999
2000s	2000, 2001, 2002, 2003, 2004, 2005, 2006, 2007, 2008, 2009
2010s	2010, 2011, 2012, 2013, 2014, 2015, 2016, 2017, 2018, 2019
2020s	2020, 2021, 2022, 2023, 2024, 2025, 2026

== Seasons ==
=== Pre-1940 ===
Year	TD	TS	TY	Strongest storm	Deaths	Damage	Notes							
Year	TD	TS	TY	Strongest storm	Deaths	Damage	Notes	1900	–	23	–	TY Guam typhoon	>1,965	Unknown
1901	–	21	–	TY De Witte typhoon	>4	Unknown								
1912	27	-	–	TY Tacloban typhoon	>51,002	Unknown								
1922	24	-	–	VSTY Swatow typhoon	>50,000–100,000+	Unknown								
1927	27	25	19	VITY Eleven	15,159	$4 million								
1931	30	–	19	TY Unnamed	300,349	Unknown								
1934	29	–	-	VITY Muroto typhoon	>3,066	Unknown								
1936	33	–	19	VITY Ten	2,341	Unknown								
1937	25	–	18	TY Unnamed	11,525	Unknown								
1938	31	–	–	TY Unnamed	338	Unknown								
1939	28	24	22	TY Twenty-Six	1,185	$106.15 million								

=== 1940s ===
Year	TD	TS	TY	STY	Strongest storm	Deaths	Damage (USD)	Retired names	Notes								
Year	TD	TS	TY	STY	Strongest storm	Deaths	Damage (USD)	Retired names	Notes	1940	43	–	27	–	TY July typhoon	183	Unknown
1941	–	28	–	–	TY Unknown	Unknown	Unknown										
1942	–	30	–	–	TY Unknown	Unknown	Unknown										
1943	–	34	–	–	TY Unknown	Unknown	Unknown										
1944	–	23	–	–	VITY Cobra	>790	Unknown										
1945	–	26	13	–	TY Ida	>3,798	Unknown	None	First official season to be included in the West Pacific typhoon database								
1946	–	15	10	–	TY Lilly	Unknown	Unknown	None									
1947	–	27	19	1	TY Rosalind	Unknown	Unknown	None									
1948	–	26	15	1	TY Libby	Unknown	Unknown	None									
1949	33	22	14	1	TY Allyn	>1,790	$127 million	TY Kitty; TY Lise; TS Madeline; TY Nelly; TY Omelia; TY Patricia; TY Rena; TY Allyn; TY Camilla									

=== 1950s ===
Year	TD	TS	TY	STY	Strongest storm	Deaths	Damage (USD)	Retired names (JTWC)	Notes									
Year	TD	TS	TY	STY	Strongest storm	Deaths	Damage (USD)	Retired names (JTWC)	Notes	1950	–	18	12	1	STY Doris	544	Unknown	TS Delilah; TS Helene; TY Jane; TY Kezia; TS Lucretia; TY Missatha; TY Ossia; TY Petie
1951	31	25	16	1	TY Marge	1,185	$106.15 million	None										
1952	–	29	20	6	STY Wilma	1,070	Unknown	TS Jeanne; TY Lois; TY Nona; TY Vae; STY Wilma										
1953	–	24	17	5	STY Nina	430	Unknown	None										
1954	33	19	15	5	STY Ida	1,530	Unknown	None										
1955	39	31	20	4	STY Clara	Unknown	Unknown	None										
1956	39	26	18	5	STY Wanda	>5,980	$60.5 million	None										
1957	27	22	18	8	STY Lola	644	Unknown	None										
1958	24	23	21	9	STY Ida	Unknown	Unknown	None										
1959	33	25	18	8	STY Joan	>8,557	$755 million	None	Featured Vera, the strongest typhoon on record to make landfall in Japan									

=== 1960s ===
Year	TD	TS	TY	STY	Strongest storm	Deaths	Damage (USD)	Retired names		Notes
Year	TD	TS	TY	STY	Strongest storm	Deaths	Damage (USD)	JTWC	PAGASA	Notes
1960	39	30	19	2	STY Shirley	>2,869	$69 million	TS Lucille; STY Ophelia		
1961	53	35	20	8	STY Nancy	308	Unknown	None		
1962	38	30	23	6	STY Emma	1,700	$325 million	STY Karen		
1963	36	25	19	8	STY Judy	Unknown	Unknown	None	None	First season in which PAGASA names tropical cyclones
1964	58	39	26	7	STY Sally (Aring); STY Wilda	>8,743	Unknown	TY Tilda	TY Dading	Most active tropical cyclone season recorded globally
1965	44	35	21	11	STY Bess	Unknown	Unknown	None	None	Record high eleven super typhoons formed, tied with 1997; Saw each month having at least one named storm
1966	51	30	20	3	STY Kit (Emang)	1,146	$377.6 million	None	None	
1967	40	35	20	5	STY Carla (Trining)	Unknown	Unknown	None	STY Welming	
1968	39	29	20	4	STY Agnes	Unknown	Unknown	None	None	
1969	34	23	13	2	STY Elsie (Narsing)	Unknown	Unknown	None	None	
Total	432	308	201	56		>14,766	$771.6 million	4 names	2 names	

=== 1970s ===
Year	TD	TS	TY	STY	Strongest storm	Deaths	Damage (USD)	Retired names		Notes
Year	TD	TS	TY	STY	Strongest storm	Deaths	Damage (USD)	JTWC	PAGASA	Notes
1970	31	26	13	7	TY Hope	>1,847	>$216 million	None	STY Pitang; STY Sening; TY Titang; TY Yoling	
1971	70	35	24	6	TY Irma (Ining)	617	$57.7 million	None	None	
1972	63	31	24	2	TY Rita (Gloring)	1,169	$585 million	None	None	
1973	39	21	12	3	VITY Nora (Luming)	>1,011	>$7 million	None	None	Featured the second most intense typhoon on record, Nora (tied with June 1975)
1974	55	32	16	0	TY Gloria (Aning)	>361	>1.55 billion	TY Bess	TY Wening	
1975	39	21	14	3	VITY June (Rosing)	>229,195	>$1.35 billion	None	None	Deadliest typhoon season on record; Featured June, the second most intense typhoon on record (tied with Nora 1973)
1976	51	25	15	4	TY Louise (Welpring)	>650	>$1.16 billion	None	TY Didang	
1977	54	21	11	3	VITY Babe (Miling)	>235	>$23 million	None	TY Unding	
1978	63	30	16	1	VITY Rita (Kading)	>371	>$100 million	None	TY Atang; STY Kading	
1979	54	24	12	4	VITY Tip (Warling)	>541	>$2.24 billion	None	None	Tip was the largest and most intense tropical cyclone ever recorded
Total	544	266	157	31	VITY Tip (Warling)	>235,997	>$7.29 billion	1 name	9 names	

=== 1980s ===
Year	TD	TS	TY	STY	Strongest storm	Deaths	Damage (USD)	Retired names		Notes
Year	TD	TS	TY	STY	Strongest storm	Deaths	Damage (USD)	JTWC	PAGASA	Notes
1980	44	24	15	2	VITY Wynne (Welpring)	493	>$200 million	None	None	
1981	52	29	13	2	VITY Elsie (Tasing)	>1,268	>$280.2 million	TY Hazen	None	
1982	37	25	19	2	VITY Mac (Uding)	805	>$2.41 billion	STY Bess	None	
1983	32	23	10	4	VITY Forrest (Ising)	>1,021	$397 million	None	None	Latest start for a Pacific typhoon season on record; Featured the fastest intensification of a tropical cyclone on record, Forrest
1984	44	27	16	2	VITY Vanessa (Toyang)	2,919	>$1.1 billion	TY Ike	TY Nitang; TY Undang	Second latest start for a Pacific typhoon season
1985	57	28	15	1	VITY Dot (Saling)	1,355	>$243.1 million	None	None	
1986	48	29	19	3	VITY Peggy (Gading)	>905	>$508.5 million	None	None	Wayne was the longest-lived tropical cyclone on record in the north-western Pacific
1987	32	23	17	6	VITY Betty (Hermng)	1,402	$1.3 billion	None	STY Katring; STY Herming; STY Sisang	
1988	54	31	11	1	STY Nelson (Paring)	>786	>$503.9 million	TY Roy	TY Unsang; TY Yoning	
1989	55	32	20	5	STY Gordon (Goring); STY Elsie (Tasing)	3,328	$2.24 billion	None	None	
Total	455	271	155	28	STY Forrest (Ising)	>13,477	>$9.18 billion	4 names	7 names	

=== 1990s ===
Year	TD	TS	TY	STY	Strongest storm	Deaths	Damage (USD)	Retired names		Notes
Year	TD	TS	TY	STY	Strongest storm	Deaths	Damage (USD)	JTWC	PAGASA	Notes
1990	41	29	19	4	VITY Flo (Norming)	1,780	$3.95 billion	STY Mike	STY Ruping	
1991	38	29	17	5	VITY Yuri	5,964	$17.44 billion	STY Mireille; TS Thelma	TS Uring	Mireille was the costliest typhoon on record, until surpassed by Doksuri in 2023; Thelma was the deadliest storm to affect the Philippines at the time
1992	40	31	16	5	VITY Gay (Seniang)	431	$3.38 billion	STY Omar	None	Third highest ACE attained on record
1993	50	28	15	3	VITY Koryn (Goring)	1,743	$3.78 billion	None	TY Monang	Most active typhoon season in the Philippines on record
1994	52	36	18	6	VITY Melissa; VITY Seth (Bidang)	3,407	$8.54 billion	None	None	Second most active tropical cyclone season on record; Fifth highest ACE attained on record
1995	47	24	8	5	VITY Angela (Rosing)	1,464	$2.57 billion	STY Angela	STY Rosing	
1996	52	25	16	6	VSTY Herb (Huaning)	1,829	$8.5 billion	None	None	
1997	47	28	16	11	VITY Ivan (Narsing); VITY Joan	4,159	$5.074 billion	None	None	Highest ACE attained by a tropical cyclone season on record; Most Category 5 storms in a single season on record; Featured two simultaneous Category 5 typhoons at the same time (Ivan and Joan)
1998	33	16	8	3	VITY Zeb (Iliang)	967	$2.23 billion	None	STY Iliang; STY Loleng	Latest start for the first named system to develop; Second least active Pacific typhoon season on record
1999	45	20	5	1	STY Bart (Oniang)	1,798	$3.63 billion	None	None	Featured the lowest number of typhoons on record
Total	445	266	138	38	VITY Flo (Norming)	23,542	$59.08 billion	5 names	6 names	

=== 2000s ===
Year	TD	TS	TY	STY	Strongest storm	Deaths	Damage (USD)	Retired names		Notes
Year	TD	TS	TY	STY	Strongest storm	Deaths	Damage (USD)	JMA	PAGASA	Notes
2000	51	23	13	4	VITY Bilis (Isang)	467	>$13.12 billion	None	None	First year using names assigned by the JMA
2001	45	25	16	3	VITY Faxai	1,193	$2.32 billion	TS Vamei	TY Nanang	Featured Vamei, the closest tropical cyclone to the equator
2002	44	26	15	8	VSTY Fengshen	725	$9.54 billion	VSTY Chataan; TY Rusa; VSTY Pongsona	None	Featured Chataan, the deadliest typhoon to impact Chuuk in Micronesia; Featured Pongsona, one of the strongest typhoon to impact Guam on record
2003	45	21	14	5	VITY Maemi (Pogi)	360	$6.43 billion	TS Yanyan; VSTY Imbudo; VITY Maemi	STY Harurot	Featured Maemi, the most powerful typhoon to strike South Korea on record
2004	45	29	19	6	VITY Chaba	2,435	$18.51 billion	VSTY Sudal; TY Tingting; TY Rananim	TY Unding; TD Violeta; TD Winnie	Most active Pacific typhoon season since 1994; Attained the second highest ACE value for a season on record, behind 1997
2005	33	24	13	4	VITY Haitang (Feria)	629	$9.73 billion	TY Matsa; VSTY Nabi; VSTY Longwang	None	Featured multiple typhoon landfalls in Taiwan and China; One of a few Pacific typhoon seasons to be less active than the Atlantic
2006	43	23	15	6	VITY Yagi	3,886	$14.4 billion	VSTY Chanchu; STS Bilis; VITY Saomai; VSTY Xangsane; VITY Durian	TY Milenyo; STY Reming	Deadliest season since 1994; Highest ratio of intense typhoons to all typhoons since 1970; Featured multiple typhoon landfalls in the Philippines and China
2007	45	24	14	5	VITY Sepat (Egay)	463	$7.73 billion	None	None	Featured Wipha, the strongest typhoon in China since Saomai in 2006
2008	41	22	11	3	VITY Jangmi (Ofel)	1,965	$5.97 billion	None	TY Cosme; TY Frank	First season to have four named storms in May since 1980; Featured Fengshen, the deadliest typhoon in the Philippines since Durian in 2006
2009	41	22	13	5	VITY Nida (Vinta)	2,348	$10.29 billion	TY Morakot; TY Ketsana; VSTY Parma	TS Feria; TS Ondoy; STY Pepeng	Featured Morakot, the wettest and deadliest typhoon to impact Taiwan in recorded history; Featured Ketsana and Parma, tied as the deadliest typhoon in the Philippines in the season; Featured Nida, the strongest late season tropical cyclone since Faxai in 2001
Total	433	239	143	48	VITY Nida (Vinta)	14,471	$98.04 billion	21 names	13 names	

=== 2010s ===
Year	TD	TS	TY	STY	Strongest storm	Deaths	Damage (USD)	Retired names		Notes
Year	TD	TS	TY	STY	Strongest storm	Deaths	Damage (USD)	JMA	PAGASA	Notes
2010	29	14	7	1	VITY Megi (Juan)	384	$2.95 billion	VSTY Fanapi	STY Juan; TY Katring	Least active Pacific typhoon season on record; Featured Megi, one of the most intense tropical cyclone on record
2011	39	21	8	4	VITY Songda (Chedeng)	3,111	$7.68 billion	STS Washi	TS Bebeng; TY Juaning; STY Mina; TY Pedring; STS Sendong	Tied for the third-most retired names by PAGASA; Featured Washi, one of the deadliest tropical cyclone to strike Mindanao
2012	34	25	14	4	VITY Sanba (Karen)	2,486	$20.79 billion	TY Vicente; VSTY Bopha	STY Pablo	Featured Bopha, the strongest storm to make landfall in Mindanao
2013	49	31	13	5	VITY Haiyan (Yolanda)	6,836	$26.43 billion	STS Sonamu; VITY Utor; TY Fitow; VITY Haiyan	STY Labuyo; TY Santi; STY Yolanda	Most active season since 1994; Deadliest season since 1975; Fifth-costliest season on record
2014	32	23	11	8	VITY Vongfong (Ompong)	572	$12.92 billion	VSTY Rammasun	TY Glenda; STY Jose; TS Mario; STY Ruby; TS Seniang	Most Category 5 typhoons since 1997; Least active since 2011; Tied for the third-most retired names by PAGASA
2015	39	27	18	9	VITY Soudelor (Hanna)	349	$14.84 billion	VITY Soudelor; VSTY Mujigae; VSTY Koppu; VSTY Melor	STY Lando; TY Nona	Saw each month having a named storm active for the first time since 1965; Fourth highest ACE value attained for a Pacific typhoon season
2016	51	26	13	6	VITY Meranti (Ferdie)	942	$17.69 billion	VITY Meranti; VSTY Sarika; VITY Haima; VITY Nock-ten	TY Karen; STY Lawin; STY Nina	Fourth latest start for a Pacific typhoon season; Second latest start for the first named system to develop; Featured Meranti, the most intense typhoon recorded since Megi in 2010
2017	42	27	11	2	VSTY Lan (Paolo)	853	$15.1 billion	TY Hato; TS Kai-tak; TY Tembin	TS Urduja; TY Vinta	Featured multiple landfalls in Indochina; Second latest start for a typhoon to develop since 1998; First since 1977 not to produce a Category 5 typhoon; Lowest number of super typhoons since 1999
2018	45	29	13	7	VITY Kong-rey (Queenie); VITY Yutu (Rosita)	793	$30.23 billion	TS Rumbia; VITY Mangkhut; VITY Yutu	STY Ompong; STY Rosita; TD Usman	Fourth earliest start for a tropical storm to develop since 1949; Third-costliest Pacific typhoon season on record
2019	50	29	17	5	VITY Halong	453	$38.96 billion	VITY Lekima; VSTY Faxai; VITY Hagibis; VSTY Kammuri; TY Phanfone	TY Tisoy; TY Ursula	Earliest start for a tropical storm to develop on record; Costliest tropical cyclone season on record outside of the Atlantic; Least deadly season since 2015
Total	410	252	125	51	VITY Megi (Juan)	16,779	$188 billion	28 names	28 names	

=== 2020s ===
Year	TD	TS	TY	STY	Strongest storm	Deaths	Damage (USD)	Retired names		Notes
Year	TD	TS	TY	STY	Strongest storm	Deaths	Damage (USD)	JMA	PAGASA	Notes
2020	32	23	10	2	VITY Goni (Rolly)	472	$5.35 billion	VSTY Vongfong; TS Linfa; VSTY Molave; VITY Goni; VSTY Vamco	TY Ambo; TY Quinta; STY Rolly; TY Ulysses	Featured Goni, the strongest landfalling tropical cyclone on record (in terms of 1-minute sustained wind speeds); Least active season since 2014
2021	41	22	9	5	VITY Surigae (Bising)	579	$4.14 billion	STS Conson; STS Kompasu; VITY Rai	TY Jolina; STS Maring; STY Odette	Includes Surigae, the most intense typhoon ever recorded in April; Includes Rai, the deadliest and most destructive typhoon in the Philippines since Haiyan in 2013
2022	37	25	10	3	VITY Nanmadol (Josie)	518	$7.18 billion	VSTY Malakas; TS Megi; STS Ma-on; VITY Hinnamnor; VSTY Noru; STS Nalgae	TS Agaton; STS Florita; STY Karding; STS Paeng	Featured one of the lowest number of super typhoons on record; Third most retired names on record by the JMA
2023	30	17	10	4	VITY Mawar (Betty)	214	$38.1 billion	VSTY Doksuri; VITY Saola; VSTY Haikui	STY Egay; STY Goring	Featured Mawar, the most intense tropical cyclone in May; Third least active Pacific typhoon season on record; Second costliest Pacific typhoon season on record; Includes Doksuri, the costliest Pacific typhoon on record
2024	38	26	13	6	VITY Yagi (Enteng)	1,502	$29.7 billion	TY Ewiniar; VITY Yagi; TY Jebi; VITY Krathon; STS Trami; VSTY Kong-rey; TY Toraji; VSTY Usagi; VITY Man-yi	TY Aghon; STS Enteng; STY Julian; STS Kristine; STY Leon; TY Nika; STY Ofel; STY Pepito	Fifth latest start for a Pacific typhoon season; Deadliest Pacific typhoon season since 2013; Most active Pacific typhoon season since 2019; Fourth-costliest season on record; First season to have four storms active at the same time in November since 2019; Featured second most multiple typhoons to hit the Philippines, only behind 2006; Featured multiple typhoon landfalls in Taiwan since 2016; Most retired names on record by the JMA and PAGASA
2025	42	27	13	2	VITY Ragasa (Nando)	653	$10.5 billion	STS Wipha; STS Co-May; STS Mitag; VITY Ragasa; TY Bualoi; TY Matmo; VSTY Kalmaegi; VSTY Fung-wong	STS Crising; TY Emong; TS Mirasol; STY Nando; TY Opong; TY Tino; STY Uwan	Fifth latest start for a named system to develop; Lowest number of super typhoons since 2017; Most active typhoon season in the Philippines since 2013; First season to feature multiple typhoon landfalls in Indochina since 2020; Second most retired names on record by the JMA and PAGASA
2026	47	32	15	7	VITY Champi (Rosal); VITY Bavi (Inday)	284+	$10 billion	TBD	TBD	Most active season for the named storms since 1994; Tied with 1965, 1974, and 1989 for the fifth-highest number of named storms; Highest number of named storms in the 21st century, surpassing 2013 with 31.; Earliest start for a named storm since 2019; Earliest first super typhoon since 2019; Saw each month having at least one named storm, the first time since 2015
Total	264	171	80	30	VITY Surigae (Bising)	4,066	$105 billion	34 names	28 names	

== See also ==
=== Parent topics ===
- Tropical cyclone
- List of environment topics
- Outline of tropical cyclones
- Tropical cyclone naming

=== Other tropical cyclone basins ===
- Atlantic hurricane season
- Pacific hurricane season
- North Indian Ocean tropical cyclone season
- South-West Indian Ocean tropical cyclone season
- Australian region tropical cyclone season
- South Pacific tropical cyclone season
- South Atlantic tropical cyclone
- Mediterranean tropical-like cyclone
