= Typhoon Betty (1987) =

Pacific typhoon

Typhoon Betty (Herming)
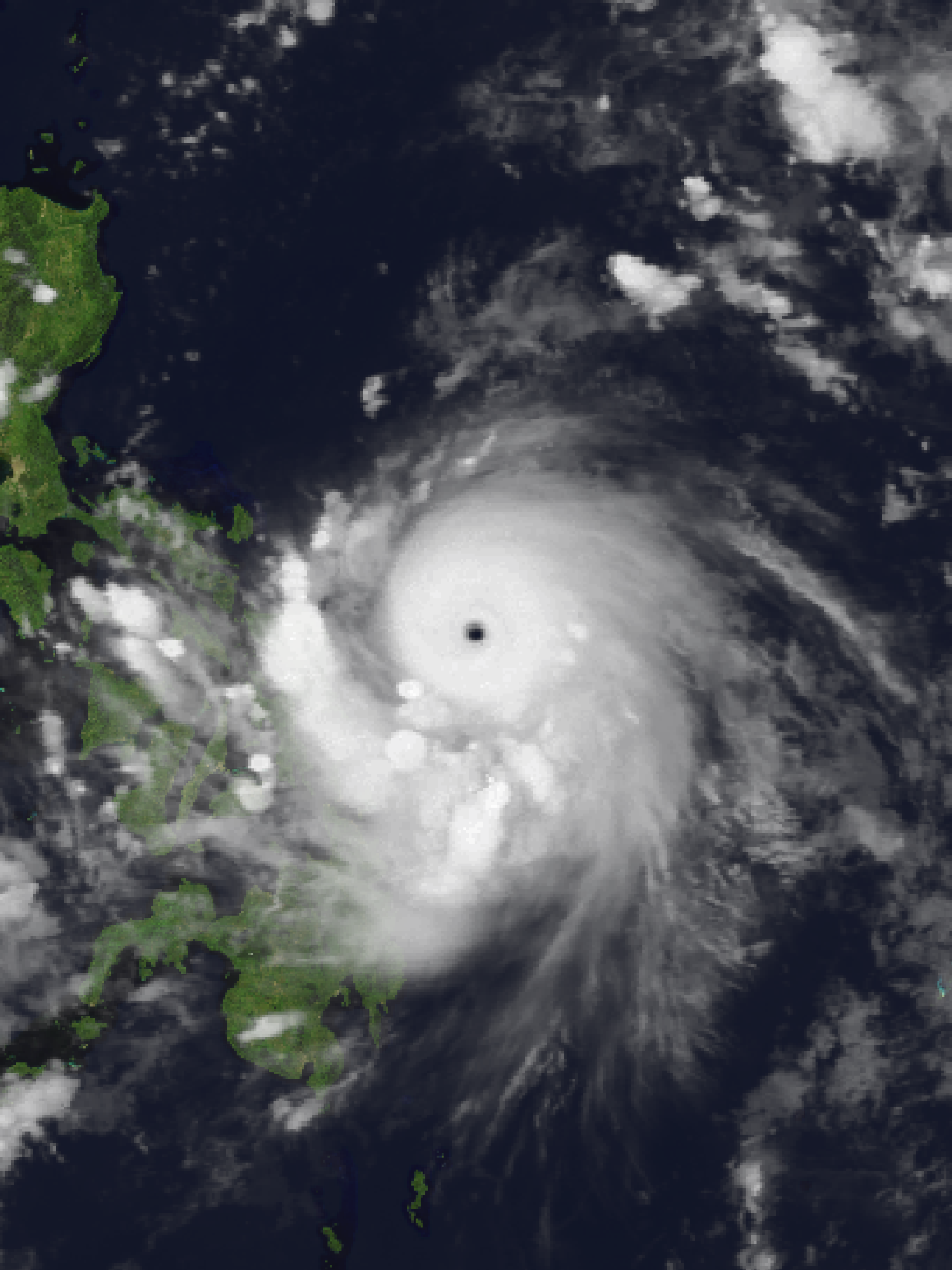
- Typhoon Betty east of the Philippines at peak intensity on August 11

Meteorological history
- Formed: August 8, 1987
- Dissipated: August 17, 1987

Violent typhoon
- 10-minute sustained (JMA)
- Highest winds: 205 km/h (125 mph)
- Lowest pressure: 890 hPa (mbar); 26.28 inHg

Category 5-equivalent super typhoon
- 1-minute sustained (SSHWS/JTWC)
- Highest winds: 260 km/h (160 mph)
- Lowest pressure: 891 hPa (mbar); 26.31 inHg

Overall effects
- Fatalities: 92
- Damage: $100 million (1987 USD)
- Areas affected: Philippines; Vietnam; Thailand
- IBTrACS
- Part of the 1987 Pacific typhoon season

Typhoon Betty, known as Typhoon Herming by PAGASA, was a powerful and destructive tropical cyclone that struck the Philippines in August 1987. The seventh typhoon and second super typhoon of the active typhoon season, it formed from the monsoon trough that spawned a tropical cyclone on August 8 while around positioned well to the east of the Philippines. It drifted northwestward, becoming a tropical storm on August 9 and a typhoon on August 10. Betty turned westward, where it rapidly intensified before attaining peak intensity on August 11. The next day, Typhoon Betty made landfall in the central Philippines. Betty weakened rapidly over the country, but restrengthened somewhat over the South China Sea. Land interaction weakened Betty slightly before it hit central Vietnam on August 16. The next day, Betty dissipated.

Across the Philippines, Typhoon Betty brought widespread flooding, which resulted in severe destruction. Damage added up to $100 million (1987 USD). In the Maguindanao and Albay provinces alone, 10,000 people were evacuated and 1,000 were homeless. However, the capital city of Manila avoided any serious damage. Nationwide, around 200,000 people were reportedly homeless, 18,000 of which were from Marinduque and another 11,400 resided on Mindoro Island. In the former, 4,000 dwellings sustained damage, and all of the banana crop there was lost. In all, 25,518 homes received damage. Roughly 400,000 people were directly affected by the storm. Overall, 85 people were killed and 324 others were wounded. After striking the Philippines, six people were killed by Betty in Vietnam. Approximately 10,000 structures were damaged and 103 people were injured. Elsewhere, in northern Thailand, one person was killed and three others were hurt by the typhoon. Several villages were flooded, and numerous streets were damaged.

== Meteorological history ==
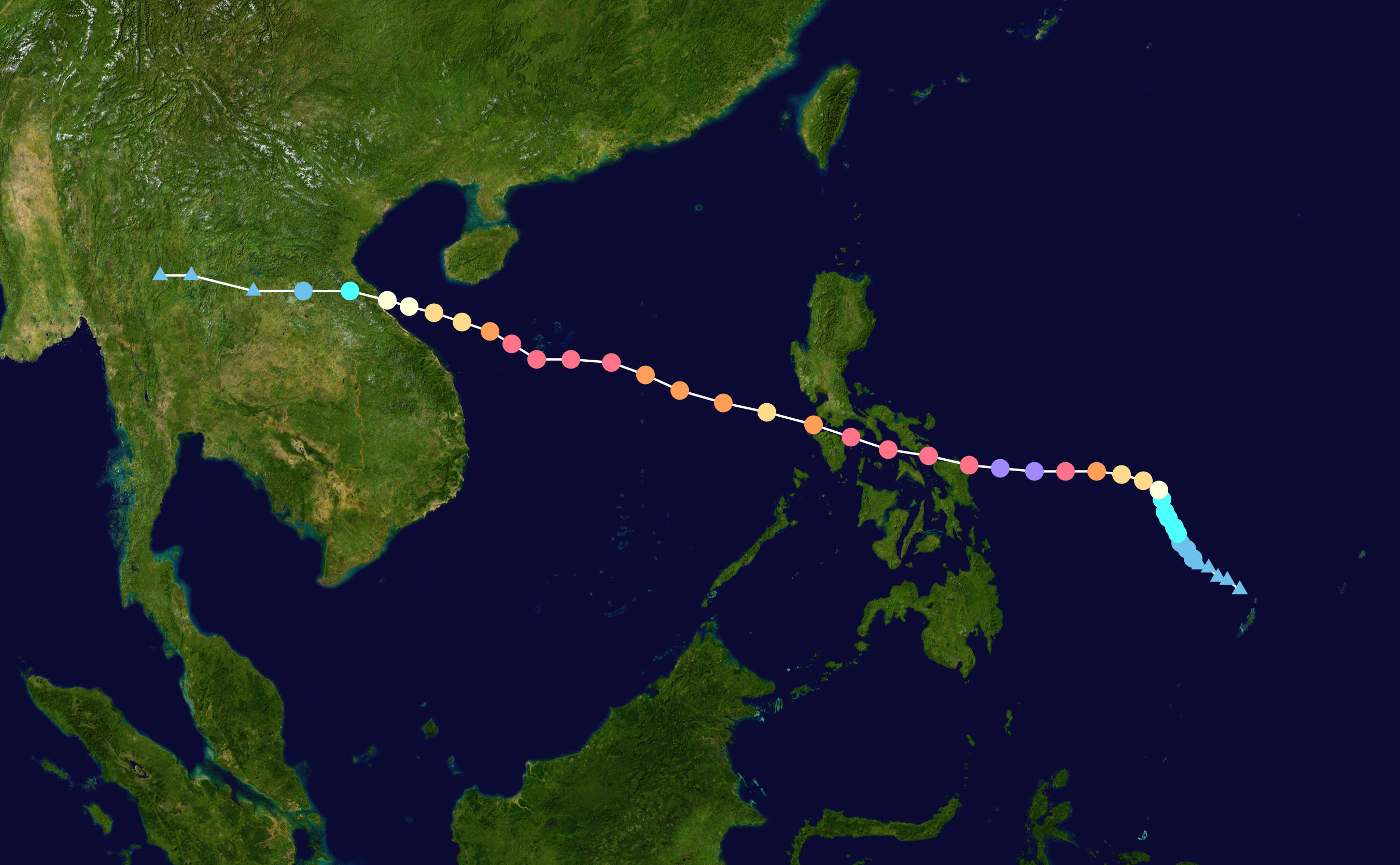
Map plotting the storm's track and intensity, according to the Saffir–Simpson scale Map key Saffir–Simpson scale Tropical depression (≤38 mph, ≤62 km/h) Tropical storm (39–73 mph, 63–118 km/h) Category 1 (74–95 mph, 119–153 km/h) Category 2 (96–110 mph, 154–177 km/h) Category 3 (111–129 mph, 178–208 km/h) Category 4 (130–156 mph, 209–251 km/h) Category 5 (≥157 mph, ≥252 km/h) Unknown Storm type Tropical cyclone Subtropical cyclone Extratropical cyclone, remnant low, tropical disturbance, or monsoon depression

The origins of Typhoon Betty can be traced back to a tropical disturbance that was embedded in the monsoon trough on August 7, which extended from the Marshall Islands westward to the Philippines. Intensity estimates via the Dvorak technique yielded winds of 50 km/h (30 mph) around 65 km (40 mi) north-northwest of Belau in the western Caroline Islands. Following a rapid increase in organization, the Joint Typhoon Warning Center (JTWC) issued a Tropical Cyclone Formation Alert (TCFA) for the system early on August 8. Meanwhile, the Japan Meteorological Agency (JMA) started tracking the system. (Note: The Japan Meteorological Agency is the official Regional Specialized Meteorological Center for the western Pacific Ocean.) Around this time, the Philippine Atmospheric, Geophysical and Astronomical Services Administration also monitored the storm and assigned it with the local name Herming. Early on August 9, Betty intensified into a tropical storm about 1,320 km (820 mi) east-southeast of Manila during the morning of August 9. (Note: Wind estimates from the JMA and most other basins throughout the world are sustained over 10 minutes, while estimates from the United States-based Joint Typhoon Warning Center are sustained over 1 minute. 10 minute winds are about 1.14 times the amount of 1 minute winds.)

Betty continued to intensify, and by midday, the storm attained winds of 80 km/h (50 mph). By the evening of August 9, the JMA upgraded Betty to a severe tropical storm. At 0000 UTC on August 10, both the JMA and JTWC believed that Betty attained typhoon intensity. Tracking westward Betty began an episode of explosive deepening as expected by the JTWC. At noon, the JTWC reported that Betty attained winds of 160 km/h (100 mph), equivalent to a Category 2 hurricane on the United States Saffir-Simpson Hurricane Wind Scale (SSHWS). By 0000 UTC on August 11, the agency upgraded Betty to an equivalent of a Category 4 hurricane. Later that day, the JMA estimated that Betty attained its peak maximum sustained wind of 190 km/h (120 mph) and a minimum barometric pressure of 890 mbar (26 inHg). However, the JTWC indicated that the system was considerably stronger, with maximum sustained winds of 260 km/h (160 mph). This concluded the storm intensification period; according to the JTWC, Betty strengthened 93 mbar (2.7 inHg) in a 37-hour time frame. Furthermore, Betty was the deepest storm of the season, and one of the most powerful storms ever recorded.

At peak, which it maintained for 12 hours, Betty exhibited a small but well-defined eye surrounded by very cold cloud tops. Thereafter, Betty began to weaken as it moved over the central Philippines. Accelerating, Betty continued on a westward track while passing south of a subtropical ridge. According to the JTWC, winds quickly decreased to 190 km/h (120 mph), and by the time it emerged into the South China Sea early on August 13, the typhoon's winds had diminished to 180 km/h (110 mph), equivalent to a high-end Category 2 on the SSHWS. The JMA estimated that Betty was slightly weaker, with winds of 170 km/h (105 mph). Moving west-northwest, Betty began to deepen over open water. By midday, the JMA increased the intensity of Typhoon Betty to 110 mph (180 km/h). On the morning of August 14, the JTWC remarked that Betty reached its secondary peak intensity of 210 km/h (130 mph). Despite this, intensity estimates from the JMA note that Betty did not intensify any further.

After attaining its secondary peak intensity, Betty began to deteriorate as it began to interact with Vietnam. After entering the Gulf of Tonkin, Betty made landfall 350 km (215 mi) south of Hanoi in northern Vietnam on August 16. At the time of landfall, the JMA estimated winds of 135 km/h (85 mph) and the JTWC estimated winds of 140 km/h (85 mph). According to the JMA, Betty weakened to a tropical storm on evening of August 16. It then swept across Laos and eventually dissipated over northern Thailand near Chiang Mai during the evening of August 17.

== Preparations, impact, and aftermath ==
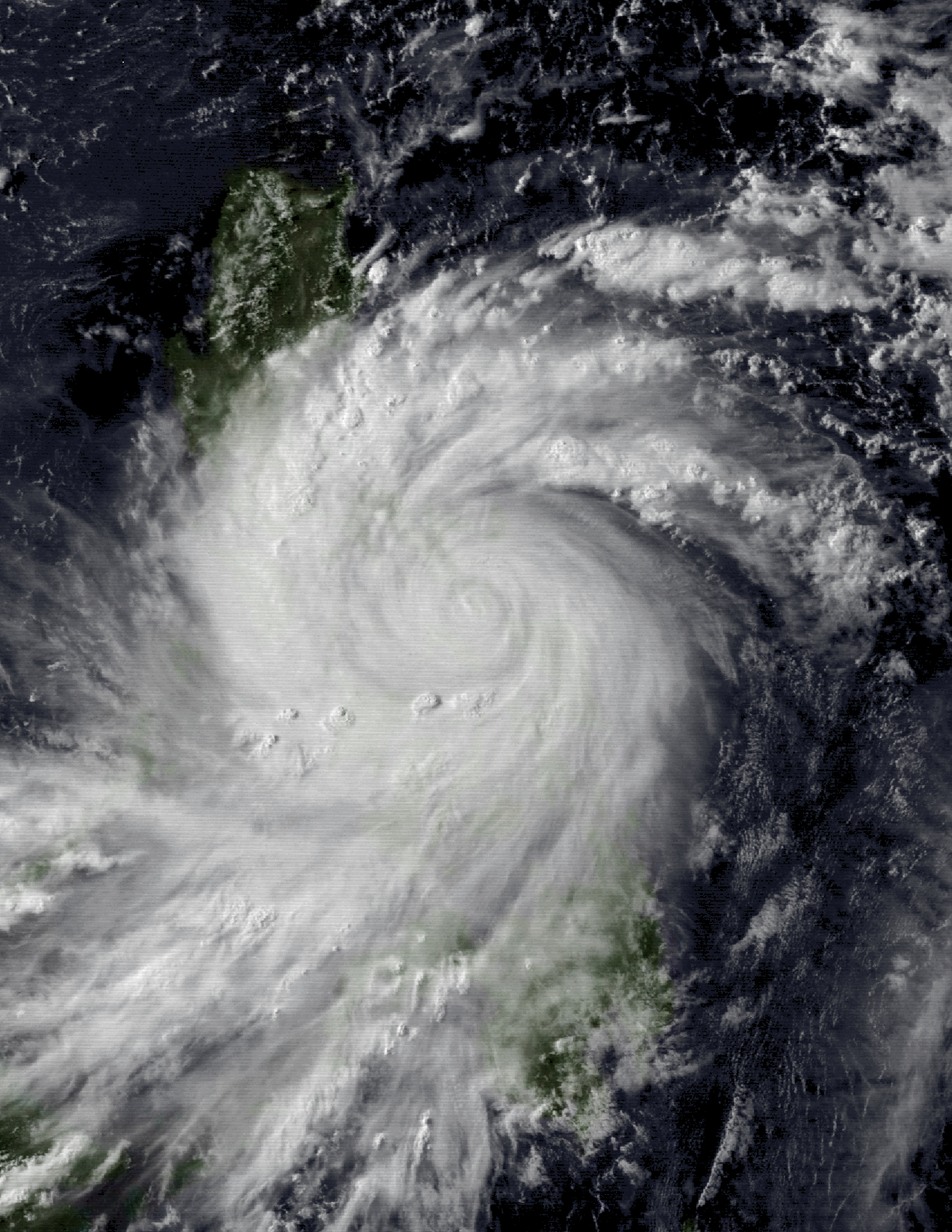
Typhoon Betty over the Philippines on August 12

=== Philippines ===
Under the anticipation that Betty would strike the Philippines, weather alerts were issued in 11 provinces. Manila was placed on "stage three" alert initially, but after the storm passed south of the city, it was downgraded to "stage two" alert. School classes were suspended and residents in low-lying areas were asked to be ready to evacuate. Warnings urging residents to prepare for the storm were broadcast via television. Eighteen ships were also evacuated. Many radio stations were closed. Typhoon Betty battered the Philippines at peak intensity, bringing heavy rains while also becoming the deepest tropical cyclone to affect the island nation since Typhoon Ike of the 1984 Pacific typhoon season. It also leveled trees and crops, demolished houses, and knocked down power lines. Many highways, crops, buildings, and homes were destroyed.

Two people were killed in San Pablo; four died in the city of Batangas. Five people were killed when they drowned in when their boat was capsized in the rough waters of the Pacific. One person was missing and five others were injured. In the Laguna province, three people, including a 6 year old boy were killed. In the resort of Tagaytay, many homes lost their roofs. Communication was lost in the Quezon province. Elsewhere, roughly 2,500 individuals were evacuated to shelter in Legazpi, many of whom were houses in schools and churches. However, the metropolis of Manila escaped any major damage, although power was lost in some places. Along the Maguindanao and Albay provinces, 10,000 people were evacuated and crop damage totaled $50,000; in the latter alone, 1,000 families were displaced. Typhoon Betty also destroyed 70 homes on Masbate Island, forcing the evacuation of 412. Five people were also killed on the island. In Marinduque, five casualties occurred and at least 4,000 houses were damaged. There, 100% of all banana and coconut trees were destroyed. The Sorsogon province sustained the worst effects from the storm, where there were 18 fatalities and at least 57,000 homes were demolished. Moreover, 19 people died on Samar Island. Six fisherman were also listed as missing. Along southern Luzon, railway service was suspended and 11 domestic flights in and out of the country on August 12 were cancelled. The next day, Philippine Airlines called off all domestic flights, including three flights each to Hong Kong, Taipei and Tokyo were cancelled. Trading was suspended on the Manila and Makati stock exchanges for a day.

Eighty-five people perished as a result of Typhoon Betty while 17 were reported missing. Nationwide, around 200,000 people were reportedly homeless, including 18,000 in Marinduque and 11,400 on Mindoro Island. A total of 25,518 homes were damaged. Roughly 400,000 people were directly affected by the storm, 371 of which were injured. Overall, damage amounted to more than PHP 2 billion ($100 million 1987 USD), including $6 million in the provinces of Batangas and Samar. Damage to roads totaled $2.1 million. Following the storm, Philippine President Corazon Aquino declared a state of calamity in more than a dozen provinces. Within a few days after Betty hit, the Philippine Airlines resumed normal flight schedules and schools were reopened. A few months following the passage of Betty, the nation itself was hit by Typhoon Nina.

=== Vietnam ===
After striking the Philippines, six people were killed by Betty in Vietnam. Approximately 10,000 structures were damaged and 103 people were wounded. Nearly 25,000 acres (10,000 ha) of rice fields were destroyed and nearly 10,000 acres (4,000 ha) of other farmland sustained damage

=== Thailand ===
In northern Thailand, one person was killed and three others were hurt by the typhoon. Several villages were flooded, and many roads were damaged.

== See also ==
- Typhoon Nina (1987) — Hit the same area a few months after Betty
- Typhoon Son-Tinh
- Typhoon Ike
- Typhoon Wutip (2013)
- Typhoon Nock-ten
