= Typhoon Mike =

Pacific typhoon in 1990

Typhoon Mike (Ruping)
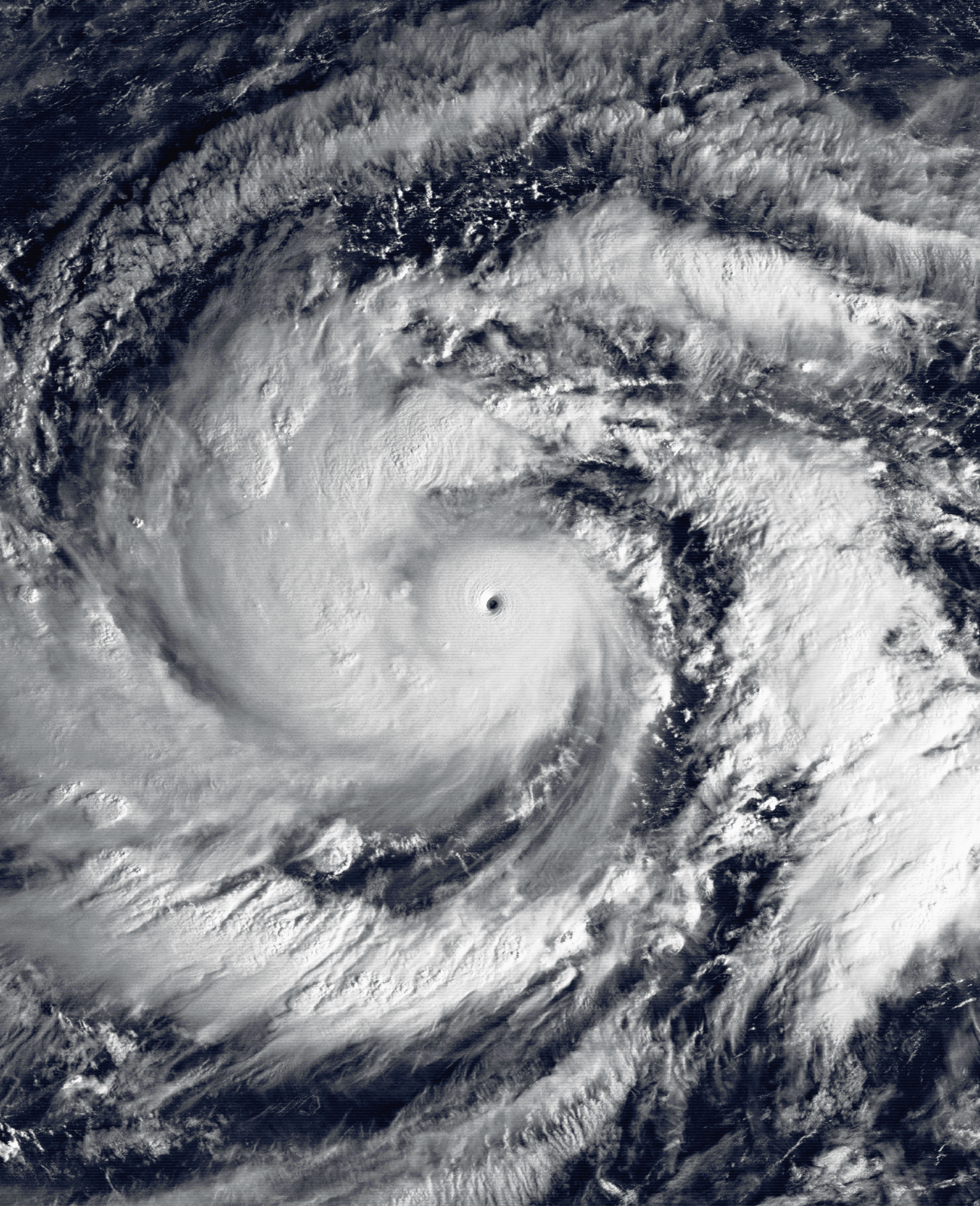
- Typhoon Mike approaching the Philippines on November 10

Meteorological history
- Formed: November 6, 1990
- Dissipated: November 18, 1990

Very strong typhoon
- 10-minute sustained (JMA)
- Highest winds: 185 km/h (115 mph)
- Lowest pressure: 915 hPa (mbar); 27.02 inHg

Category 5-equivalent super typhoon
- 1-minute sustained (SSHWS/JTWC)
- Highest winds: 280 km/h (175 mph)
- Lowest pressure: 885 hPa (mbar); 26.13 inHg

Overall effects
- Fatalities: 816 total
- Damage: $448 million (1990 USD)
- Areas affected: Caroline Islands, Philippines, Vietnam, China
- IBTrACS
- Part of the 1990 Pacific typhoon season

Typhoon Mike, named Ruping by PAGASA, was the strongest typhoon to hit the Philippines since Typhoon Irma in 1981 and Typhoon Nina in 1987. Forming from an area of persistent convection over the Caroline Islands, Mike was first designated on November 6, 1990 and moved generally westward. Later that day, the depression strengthened to Tropical Storm Mike near Yap. Mike became a typhoon early on November 9, and subsequently entered a period of rapid deepening. Late on November 10, the typhoon reached its maximum intensity of 115 mph (185 km/h), as estimated by the Japanese Meteorological Agency. After weakening slightly, Mike made landfall in the central Philippines. The storm weakened considerably due to land interaction, only to briefly re-intensify on November 14. Typhoon Mike turned west-northwest and later north-northwest, avoiding land interaction with Vietnam. Vertical wind shear increased, and on November 15, Mike weakened below typhoon intensity. Early the next day, the storm passed over western Hainan Island, and degraded to a tropical depression that night. After briefly emerging into the Gulf of Tonkin, Mike passed over Northern Vietnam and southern China, where it dissipated on November 18.

During its formative stages, Mike passed just north of Palau. There, one person was injured and around 90% of the banana and coconut crops were leveled. A total of 1,035 houses and 10 businesses were damaged. Damage on the island totaled $2 million, including $1.3 million in property damage. After striking the Philippines, the typhoon brought widespread damage and was considered the worst typhoon to hit the country since Nina in 1987. In Cebu City, 88 ships sunk, the most ships ever sunk at the Cebu City harbor during a tropical cyclone. Power and phone lines were downed and the city lost access to drinking water for two days. Approximately 60% of all buildings were demolished and 28 people perished in the city. Nationwide, 748 people were killed while 1,274 others suffered injuries. A total of 1,900,000 t (2,094,390 short tons) of sugar crops were destroyed. A total of 630,885 homes were damaged and 222,026 houses were demolished, resulting in 1,110,020 people displaced. Offshore, 159 vessels sunk and 28 others were washed aground and damaged. Monetary damage was estimated at $446 million (₱10.8 billion), including $46.1 million (₱1.12 billion) from crops, $350 million (₱8.52 billion) from public infrastructure, and $49.9 million (₱1.21 billion) from private infrastructure. At the time, Mike was the costliest tropical cyclone listed in the National Disaster Risk Reduction and Management Council's database, and as of 2014, is the seventh costliest typhoon to strike the country since independence in 1947. Elsewhere, 68 people were killed in Vietnam, but no damage was reported in China.

== Meteorological history ==
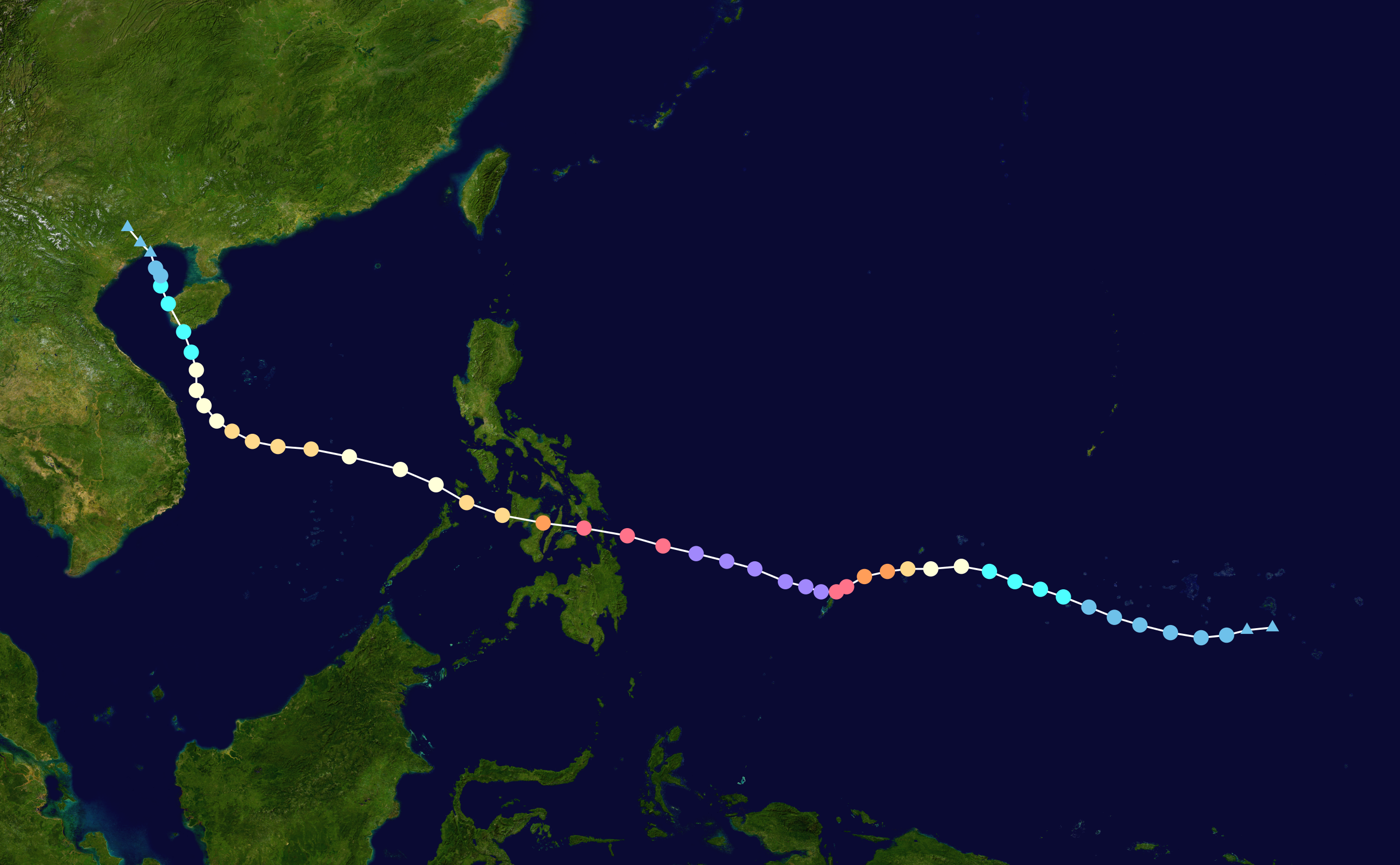
Map plotting the storm's track and intensity, according to the Saffir–Simpson scale Map key Saffir–Simpson scale Tropical depression (≤38 mph, ≤62 km/h) Tropical storm (39–73 mph, 63–118 km/h) Category 1 (74–95 mph, 119–153 km/h) Category 2 (96–110 mph, 154–177 km/h) Category 3 (111–129 mph, 178–208 km/h) Category 4 (130–156 mph, 209–251 km/h) Category 5 (≥157 mph, ≥252 km/h) Unknown Storm type Tropical cyclone Subtropical cyclone Extratropical cyclone, remnant low, tropical disturbance, or monsoon depression

Typhoon Mike originated from a persistent area of convection that was first monitored by the Joint Typhoon Warning Center (JTWC) early on November 6. At midday, the Japan Meteorological Agency (JMA) followed suit. (Note: The Japan Meteorological Agency is the official Regional Specialized Meteorological Center for the western Pacific Ocean.) At 15:03 UTC on November 6, the JTWC issued a Tropical Cyclone Formation Alert, after a rapid improvement in the system's convective structure and Dvorak estimates of T1.0/50 km/h (30 mph). Following an increase in the storm's convection and an expansion of its outflow, the JTWC upgraded the system into a tropical depression at 12:00 UTC on November 7. Several hours later, the JMA classified the system as a tropical storm. (Note: Wind estimates from the JMA and most other basins throughout the world are sustained over 10 minutes, while estimates from the United States-based Joint Typhoon Warning Center are sustained over 1 minute. 10-minute winds are about 1.14 times the amount of 1-minute winds.) At 00:00 UTC on November 8, the JTWC upgraded the depression into Tropical Storm Mike.

After becoming a tropical storm, Mike tracked west-northwest under the influence of a subtropical ridge. The JTWC initially forecast Mike to track northwest over the Philippine Sea. Later in the morning hours of November 8, the JMA classified Mike as a severe tropical storm. Shortly thereafter, Mike entered a period of rapid deepening, aided by two dual outflow channels and a trough to the northeast. Due to the formation of an eye, the JTWC declared Mike a typhoon at 00:00 UTC on November 9, with the JMA following suit six hours later. Midday on November 10, Dvorak intensity estimates reached T7.0/255 km/h (160 mph) and satellite imagery indicated a 24 km (15 mi) diameter eye and good upper-level outflow. Based on this, the JTWC raised the intensity of Mike to 250 km/h (155 mph), making Mike a super typhoon. At 18:00 UTC, the JTWC increased the winds to 280 km/h (175 mph), marking a 175 km/h (110 mph) increase in wind speed, or a barometric pressure drop of 99 mbar (2.9 inHg) in a two-day time period. Early on November 11, the JMA estimated that Mike attained its peak intensity, with winds of 185 km/h (115 mph) and a minimum pressure of 915 mbar (27.0 inHg), while the JTWC stated that it had a minimum central pressure of 885 millibars (26.1 inHg).

After turning west-northwest in the general direction of the central Philippines, Mike leveled off in intensity. Land interaction took toll on the typhoon on November 12 as cloud top temperatures surrounding the eye warmed and the eye became increasingly cloud-filled, coinciding with a weakening trend. Later that day, the typhoon made landfall on the Cebu province, with the JTWC and JMA reporting winds of 225 and 160 km/h (140 and 100 mph) respectively. The system maintained typhoon intensity over the island chain. After Mike entered the South China Sea, the JTWC and many tropical cyclone forecast models anticipated that the typhoon would strike into Vietnam, but this did not occur. Slight re-strengthening occurred over the open waters in the South China Sea. On November 14, the JMA reported that Mike reached a secondary peak intensity of 135 km/h (85 mph) while the JTWC estimated a secondary maximum intensity of 160 km/h (100 mph). The next day, Typhoon Mike turned north-northwest in response to a weakness in the subtropical ridge. Increased vertical wind shear induced a weakening trend, and midday on November 15, the JMA downgraded Mike to a severe tropical storm. Twenty-four hours later, the JTWC downgraded Mike to a tropical storm as its structure became less organized. Later on November 16, Mike passed over the western portion of Hainan Island, and after briefly tracking through the Gulf of Tonkin, Mike moved inland over Quảng Ninh, Vietnam as a tropical depression. Overland, Mike rapidly dissipated; both the JTWC and the JMA ended tracking the system on November 18.

== Preparations ==
Maximum storm alerts were raised across the central Philippines, with lower warnings issued for the southern tip of Luzon. Authorities advised coastal residents to move to higher ground in Samar, and Leyte islands, as well as the northern region of Mindanao. The Philippine Airlines cancelled 59 domestic flights from Manila and Cebu, but international flights were unaffected. Schools were called off in northern Mindanao and domestic shipping services were temporarily cancelled.

== Impact ==
=== Caroline Islands ===
During its formative stages, Mike caused minor damage in Yap. The storm passed 85 km (53 mi) north of Koror, the capital of Palau. The local National Weather Service office recorded winds of 133 km/h (83 mph), 250 mm (9.8 in) of rain, and a minimum sea level pressure of 980.5 mbar (28.95 inHg). Power, water and telephone services were knocked out and streets were blocked by fallen trees. Many roofs were lost and extensive damage occurred to boats, greenhouses, agriculture projects, fruit trees and vegetable gardens. The heaviest damage occurred in the states of Ngaraard, Ngarchelong, and Kayangel. In Ngaraard, 50% of houses were destroyed and the other 50% were damaged. Across the state of Kayangel, situated just to the north of the island of Babelthuap, most trees were uprooted and a majority of residents lost everything. Nationwide, around 90% of the banana and coconut crops were leveled. In all, one person was wounded but no fatalities were reported, but the area the storm struck was sparsely populated. A total of 1,035 homes and 10 businesses were damaged. Damage on Palau totaled $2 million, $1.3 million of which was property damage. Until Typhoon Bopha in December 2012, Mike was the most recent typhoon to hit Palau.

=== Philippines ===
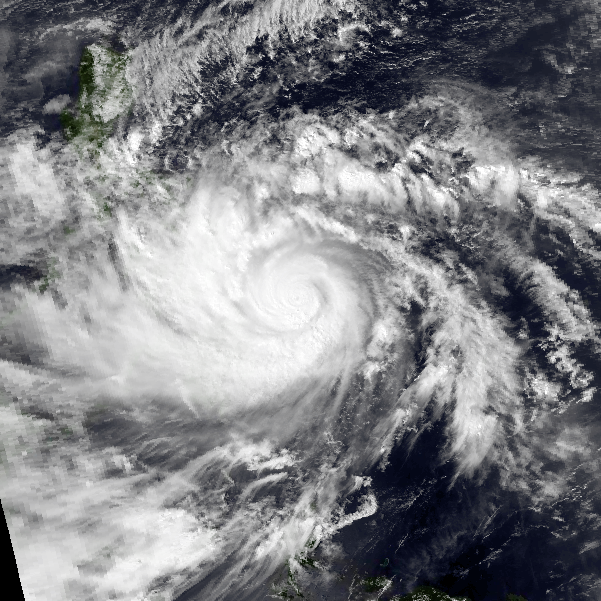
Typhoon Mike nearing the Philippines on November 12

Typhoon Mike was the strongest typhoon to strike the Philippines since Typhoon Irma in November 1981. Mike was also the most severe typhoon to hit the Philippines since Typhoon Ike during September 1984, which killed over 1,000 people. The typhoon destroyed a television broadcast tower, radio towers, electric cables and bridges, which resulted in widespread power outages and several radio stations briefly went off air. Hundreds of villages were also rendered impassable.

Twenty-five crewmen and passengers of the commercial vessel MV Dona Roberta were reported missing after it sank from strong waves in the southern quadrant of the typhoon. Two sailors were also rescued. Eighty-eight ships sunk at the Cebu City harbor, the most ships ever sunk at the harbor, eclipsing the previous record set by Typhoon Amy of the 1951 season. Of the 88 ships that sunk, at least 12 were passenger ships and at least 3 were navy ships. Rainfall peaked at 276.1 mm (10.87 in) at the port of Cebu City; this was the fourth highest total ever observed by a tropical cyclone in Cebu City. Furthermore, a storm surge of 3 to 4 m (9.8 to 13.1 ft) was reported. Power and phone lines were downed and the city lost access to drinking water for two days. Approximately 60% of all buildings were demolished and 28 people perished. Throughout the Cebu province, 40 fatalities were reported and 90% of all wooden homes were damaged or destroyed.

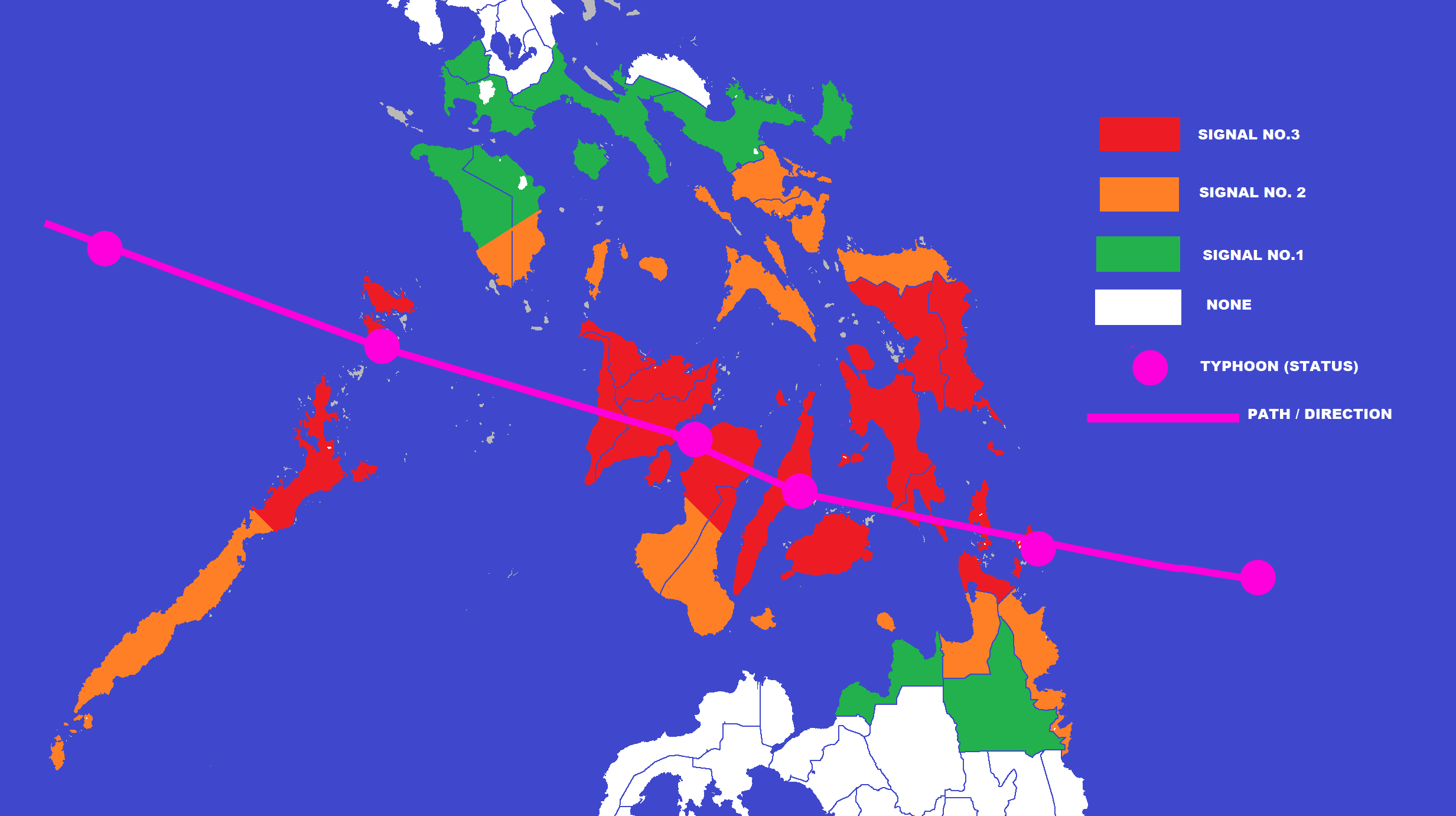
Map of Public Storm Warning Signal

Elsewhere across the Philippines, six individuals perished due to drownings in the Leyte province. Across Leyte island, more than 50,000 people fled their homes. In the Negros Occidental province, five casualties occurred, including three that drowned in 1.6 m (5.2 ft) floodwaters. A total of 27 people perished in a landslide in Isabela. Throughout Negros island, 35 people were killed, with 61 others reported missing. In six towns across the island, 9,500 people were evacuated to shelter. Nevertheless, the typhoon's inner core spared Manila's metropolitan area. A tornado was spawned by Mike near Cagayan de Oro, which destroyed 160 houses and left thousands homeless. On Panay Island, seven people were killed, including a 10-year-old boy that was hit by a tree. Offshore, seventeen people, including six Americans, were rescued on an oil rig, and sixty-eight other workers were evacuated. Three bridges were crushed in Misamis Oriental, on Mindanao. Three people died due to rough seas offshore Misamis Oriental. In the nearby Surigao del Norte province, 32 people drowned. Offshore Mindoro Island, six ships were run aground. Another ship called the Iligan Flores was missing off the coast of Mindanao but there were no reports about the fate of the passengers and crew. In the Bohol province, 20 individuals were killed while floods up to 5 m (10 ft) high submerged roofs of cars and houses in the towns of Loboc and Loay.

Overall, 748 people were reported killed, with an additional 1,274 people hurt. Nearly 5.5 million people sought shelter in schools. Thousands of hectares of agricultural crops, including 1,900,000 t (2,094,390 short tons) of sugar crops, were destroyed. A total of 630,885 homes were damaged and 222,026 houses were destroyed, leaving 1,110,020 people homeless. One hundred fifty-nine vessels sunk and 28 others were washed aground and damaged. Two-thirds of all damages occurred in Negros Occidental and Iloilo provinces. Monetary damage was estimated at $446 million (₱10.8 billion), (Note: All currencies are converted to United States Dollars using Philippines Measuring worth with an exchange rate of the year 1990.) (Note: All damage totals are in 1990 values of their respective currencies.) with $46.1 million (₱1.12 billion) from crops, $350 million (₱8.51 billion) from public infrastructure, and $49.9 million (₱1.21 billion) from private infrastructure. At the time, Mike was the costliest tropical cyclone listed in the National Disaster Risk Reduction and Management Council's database. However, this mark was eclipsed by Typhoon Fengshen in June 2008. As of 2014, Mike is the seventh most damaging Philippine typhoon since independence in 1947.

=== Elsewhere ===
Although Typhoon Mike recurved north before striking Vietnam, the storm was responsible for the lives of 68 individuals in the Central Vietnamese province of Nghệ Tĩnh. Many fishing boats also sunk. Mike was rapidly deteriorating by the time it moved onshore China and as a result, no damage was reported.

== Aftermath ==
On November 28, the Republic of Palau was declared a disaster area. After Mike traversed the Philippines, President Corazon Aquino declared a state of calamity in 29 provinces and 24 cities in the Visayas region. Thirty-nine provinces in the Philippines were declared a disaster area, twenty-nine of which were exempted from government cuts in oil deliveries and energy conservation measures. Former Philippine First Lady Imelda Marcos offered $3.6 million for victims of the typhoon. However, she only ended up writing a check of $125,000 and even that check bounced. A total of $9.3 million was released by Aquino from a calamity fund to rehabilitate devastated areas. Around 86,840 families received food from the government, valued at $106,983. The health department sent 2,500 kg (5,500 lb) of medicine to Iloilo City for distribution to provincial health offices in affected provinces. The defense secretary ordered 150 tents to be airlifted to five affected cities. A total of 110 short tons (99,790 kg) of relief supplies were provided by the local government. Philippine navy vessels were used to transport rice from nearby island provinces. As a result of the typhoon, authorities projected annual economic growth in the Philippines would be less than 2% – down from 2.3% earlier in the year. The typhoon also prompted PAGASA to expand its warning system.

Typhoon Mike's damage to the infrastructure of Cebu forced local authorities to rethink governmental priorities, where a food shortage was observed and water was rationed. Lines for gasoline and fuel was 2.4 km (1.5 mi) long. However, the city quickly recovered, and by the end of the decade, it was experiencing rapid economic growth, dubbed Ceboom.

The United States provided $25,000 to Philippine Red Cross for immediate disaster relief needs. The United States Agency for International Development distributed 97 t (107 short tons) of food in Leyte and eastern Samar, and by November 28, the country was granted $432,000 worth of supplies and cash. The United Kingdom provided $38,000 in medicine. France loaned the country $36 million that was expected to be paid back within three decades. Belgium provided $90,252 in relief assistance. Sweden granted nearly $18,000 worth of relief items. Denmark awarded $25,950 in cash. Germany added $132,450 in tents and medicine. Japan also contributed $400,000. Catholic Relief Services provided $25,000 in relief. Caritas Internationalis donated nearly $250,000 in cash. Save The Children contributed $10,000. World Vision donated $25,000. Within the United Nations, the United Nations Office for the Coordination of Humanitarian Affairs and United Nations Development Programme offered $25,000 and $50,000 in emergency grants respectively. The United Nations Children's Fund donated $28,710 worth of medical supplies.

Due to the severity of damage and loss of life caused by the storm, the name Mike was retired and replaced with Manny. PAGASA also retired the name Ruping, which was replaced with Ritang, which was first used in the 1994 season.

== See also ==
- Typhoons in the Philippines
- Tropical Storm Kai-tak (Urduja, 2017) – a weak but deadly tropical cyclone that caused severe flooding in Visayas.
- Typhoon Rai (Odette, 2021) – a late-season Category 5 super typhoon which took a similar path and ravaged through the same areas in Visayas and northern Mindanao
- Typhoon Kalmaegi (Tino, 2025) – brought devastating flooding throughout the Central Philippines
- Typhoon Son-Tinh (Ofel, 2012) – took a similar path
- Other tropical cyclones that have struck the Central Philippines and claimed more than 1,000 lives
  - Tropical Storm Thelma (Uring, 1991)
  - Typhoon Haiyan (Yolanda, 2013)
