= Typhoon Son-Tinh =

Pacific typhoon in 2012

Typhoon Son-Tinh (Ofel)
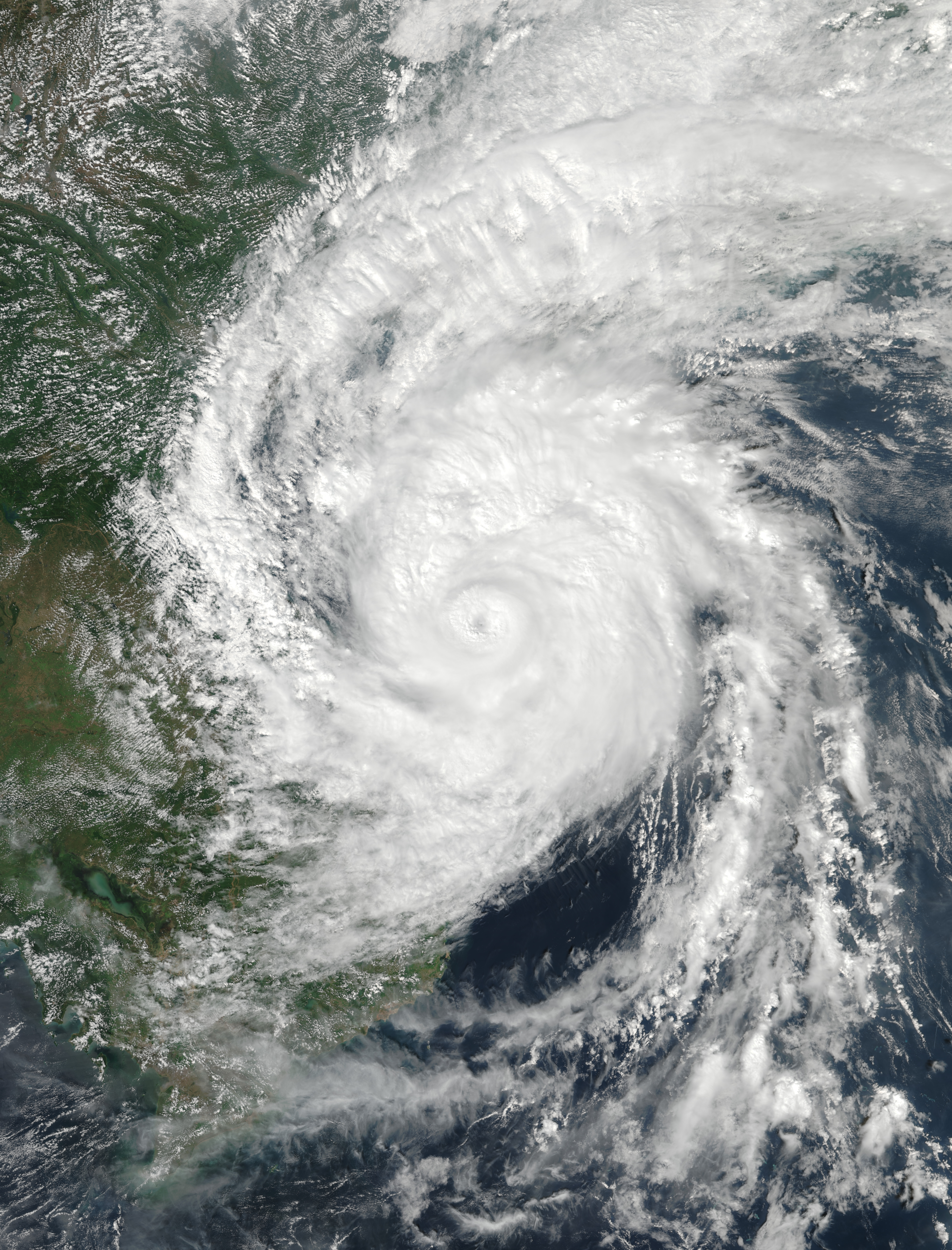
- Typhoon Son-Tinh near peak intensity on October 27

Meteorological history
- Formed: October 21, 2012
- Dissipated: October 29, 2012

Very strong typhoon
- 10-minute sustained (JMA)
- Highest winds: 155 km/h (100 mph)
- Lowest pressure: 945 hPa (mbar); 27.91 inHg

Category 3-equivalent typhoon
- 1-minute sustained (SSHWS/JTWC)
- Highest winds: 195 km/h (120 mph)
- Lowest pressure: 944 hPa (mbar); 27.88 inHg

Overall effects
- Fatalities: 42 total
- Damage: $776 million (2012 USD)
- Areas affected: Philippines, Vietnam, China
- IBTrACS
- Part of the 2012 Pacific typhoon season

Typhoon Son-Tinh, (Note: The name Son-Tinh (Vietnamese: Sơn Tinh, [səːn˧˧ tïŋ˧˧]) was contributed by Vietnam and refers to Tản Viên Sơn Thánh, the god of the Ba Vì mountain range, in Vietnamese.) known in the Philippines as Tropical Storm Ofel, was a powerful, late-forming typhoon that devastated the Philippines with tropical storm strength, and battered Northern Vietnam with hurricane-force winds at landfall on October 28, 2012. Originating from a broad area of low pressure over Palau on October 20, the system strengthened into a tropical depression by October 21, and on October 22, it became the 23rd named storm of the season.

Twenty-seven people were killed in the Philippines due to the heavy rain from Son-Tinh. Six fishermen were reported missing, and more than 13,000 passengers were stranded at ferry terminals and ports.

== Meteorological history ==
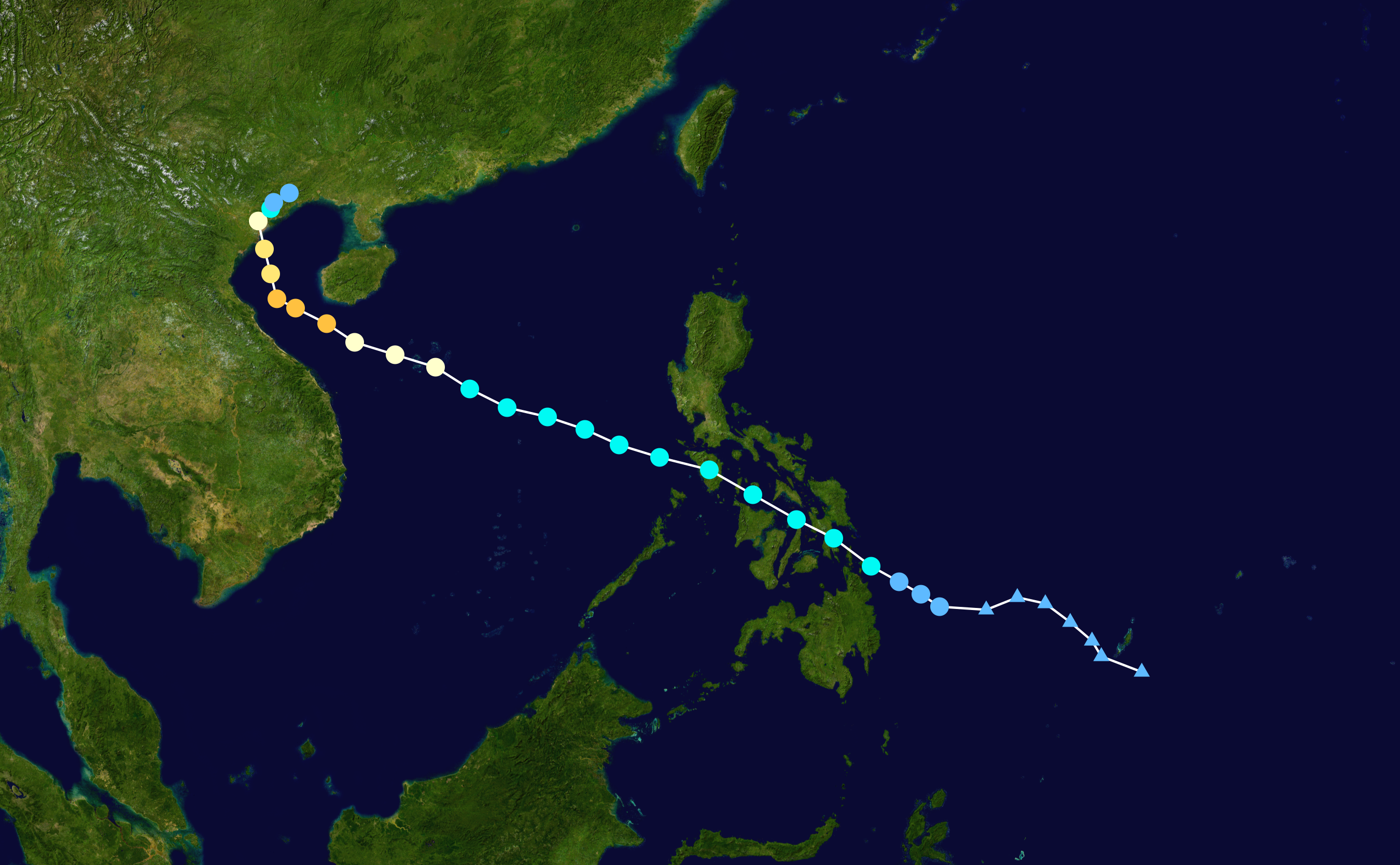
Map plotting the storm's track and intensity, according to the Saffir–Simpson scale Map key Saffir–Simpson scale Tropical depression (≤38 mph, ≤62 km/h) Tropical storm (39–73 mph, 63–118 km/h) Category 1 (74–95 mph, 119–153 km/h) Category 2 (96–110 mph, 154–177 km/h) Category 3 (111–129 mph, 178–208 km/h) Category 4 (130–156 mph, 209–251 km/h) Category 5 (≥157 mph, ≥252 km/h) Unknown Storm type Tropical cyclone Subtropical cyclone Extratropical cyclone, remnant low, tropical disturbance, or monsoon depression

At 09:30 UTC on October 21, the Joint Typhoon Warning Center (JTWC) began to monitor an area of convection that was located approximately 95 nautical miles (176 km) to the southeast of Palau. At the time, it had persistent deep convection over the southern side of its poorly-organized low-level circulation center, and was under a marginal environment of weak vertical wind shear and diffluent northeasterly flow. Three hours later, the Japan Meteorological Agency (JMA) designated the low as a tropical depression, before initiating advisories on the system early by the next day. As it moved westward, it organized its broad center, with curved banding wrapping into it. By 10:30 UTC on October 22, the JTWC issued a Tropical Cyclone Formation Alert on the system, as it continued to improve its structure. Five hours later, the PAGASA started issuing advisories on the tropical depression, as it developed in the Philippine Area of Responsibility (PAR), assigning its local name Ofel. Late on the next day, both the JMA and PAGASA reported that the tropical depression intensifed into a tropical storm, with the former naming it Son-Tinh. At the same time, the JTWC started issuing advisories on Son-tinh as a tropical depression, before subsequently upgrading it to a tropical storm by the next day, noting deep convection along the eastern half of the system's center wrapping to its western half. Son-Tinh didn't intensify further, as it made landfall over Leyte Province, before emerging to the Visayan Sea, and make landfall over three more locations: southwestern Masbate, Sibuyan Island, and southern Mindoro.

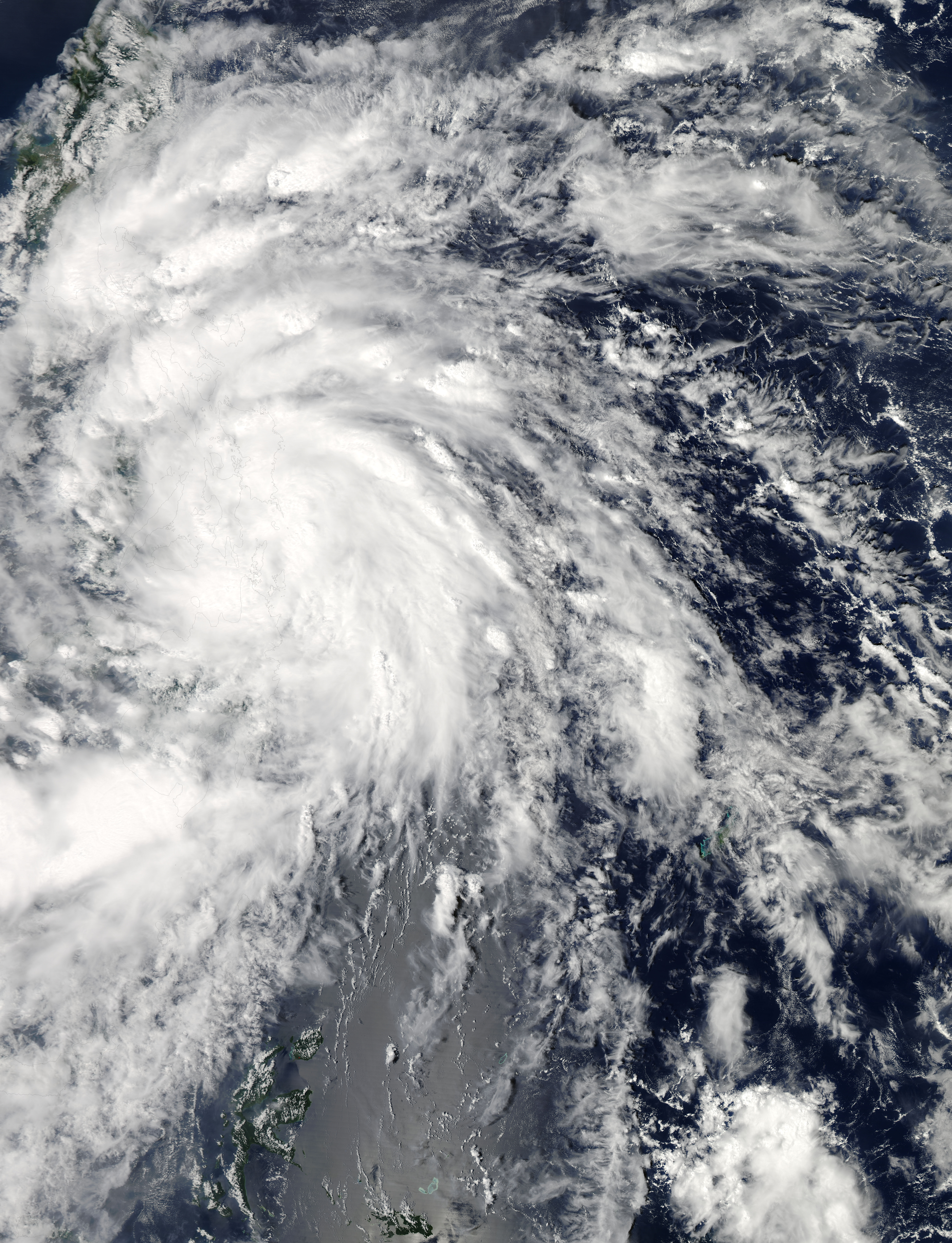
Son-Tinh making landfall on Leyte on October 24

Upon emerging to the South China Sea on October 25, Son-Tinh struggled to intensify, with the continued effects of land interaction in the eastern quadrant. Late on the same day, the JTWC noted that Son-Tinh had started to develop banding over its northern and southern peripheries, with deep convection wrapping to its center. At 06:00 UTC the next day, the JMA upgraded Son-Tinh to a severe tropical storm, as it continued westward under the influence of the subtropical ridge to its north, leaving the PAR. Twelve hours later, the JTWC upgraded Son-Tinh to a typhoon, as its structure continued to improve, with its center having tightly-curved banding. The JMA would not upgrade Son-Tinh to a typhoon until 06:00 UTC on October 27, when it developed a 15-nautical-mile-wide (28 km) eye. Son-Tinh then reached its peak intensity six hours later, as it rapidly intensified to a category 3-equivalent typhoon, while entering a hostile environment of moderate wind shear and strong westerlies to its north. With its eye soon filled, the system started weakening by the next day, as it slowed its movement, with wind shear increasing. As a result, the JTWC downgraded Son-Tinh to a category 2-equivalent typhoon, as it turned to the north-northwest. By 12:00 UTC that same day, the JMA downgraded the system to a severe tropical storm. As it made landfall between Nam Định Province–Thái Bình Province in Vietnam, the JMA downgraded Son-Tinh to a tropical storm, while the JTWC downgraded the system to a category 1-equivalent typhoon. The JTWC downgraded Son-Tinh to a tropical storm and issued their final advisory at 00:00 UTC on October 29, as it turned northeast while weakening from land interaction. Six hours later, the JMA issued their final advisory on the system, as it weakened to a tropical depression. Son-Tinh then dissipated late on the same day.

== Preparations and impact ==
=== Philippines ===
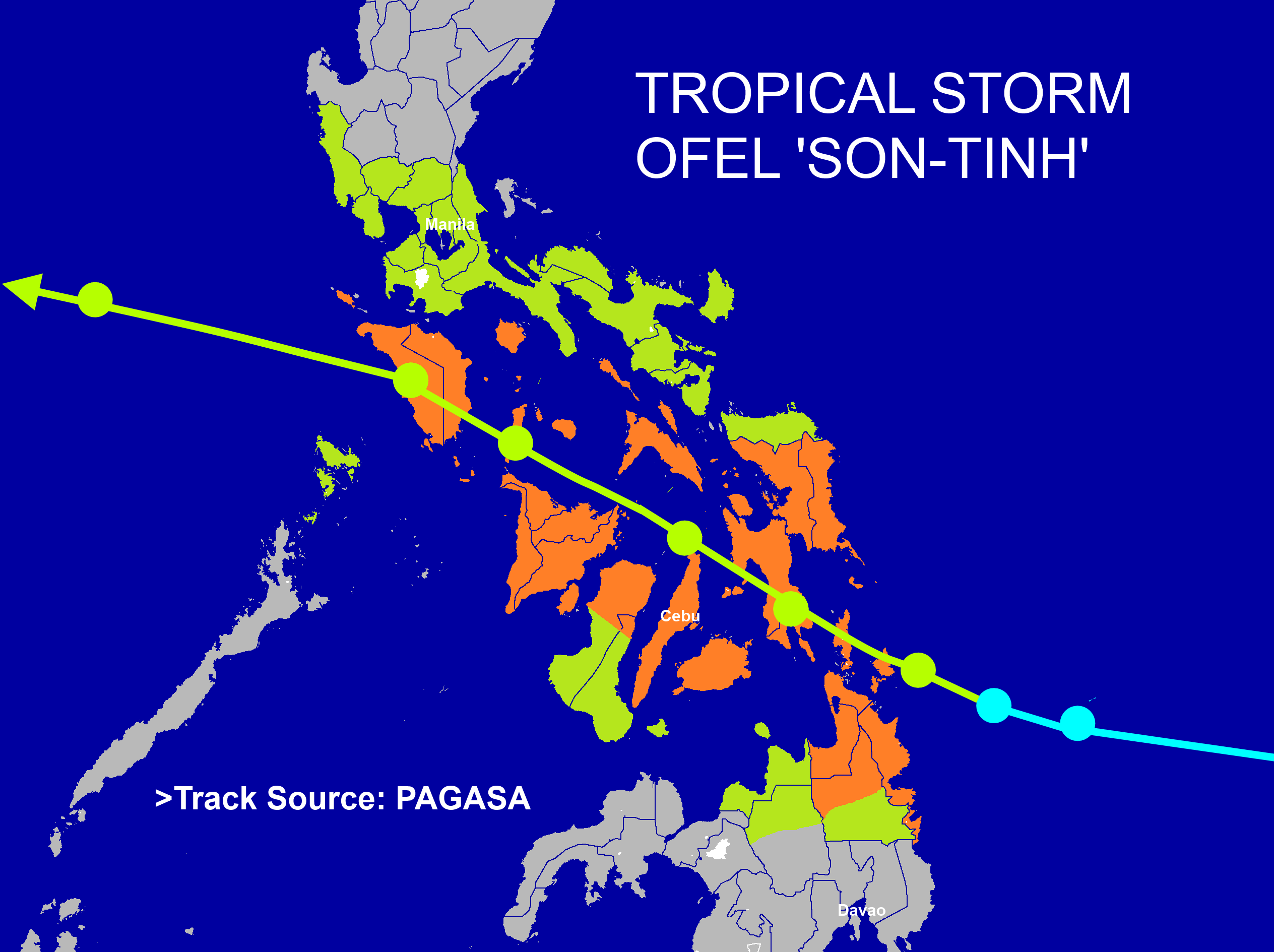
The track and the Public Storm Warning Signal of Tropical Storm Ofel during it affects the Central Philippines. Area's under the orange color are signal No. 2 while the light green color are signal No. 1

Son-Tinh was forecast to hit Central Philippines. However, it impacted the entire islands with almost every provinces of the country receiving storm signals. The PAGASA issued Storm Signals as the storm approached. Storm Signal No. 1 was hoisted over Surigao del Norte, Surigao del Sur, Agusan del Norte, Leyte provinces, Western and Eastern Samar. As the tropical depression neared the country, it intensified into a tropical storm. Signal No. 2 was hoisted over Cebu, Leyte provinces, Samar provinces and Surigao provinces.

On October 24, the storm capsized 6 boats in Tacloban City. It hardly hit Cebu with rain and winds, prompting classes in Cebu City to be suspended the next day. Authorities in the Philippines confirmed at least four deaths – an 8-year-old boy who drowned, two men crushed by falling trees, and an elderly man who died from hypothermia. Widespread flooding was reported as rivers burst their banks, in some instances rising as much as 12.8 meters in 24 hours. A cargo ship, called the ML Lady RP II, sank with around 1,200 sacks of copra near Zamboanga City at the height of the storm. Strong winds derailed a train in Quezon.

Throughout the country, 27 people were killed by the storm and damage amounted to PHP155 million (US$3.74 million).

=== China ===
The center warned ships and people in affected areas to be careful urging authorities to take full precautions. It was forecast up to 80 cm of precipitation that day along the coast of eastern and southern Hainan province and eastern coast of Leizhou peninsula.

Authorities reported that more than 82,00 people were relocated to temporary shelters as Son-Tinh moved near Hainan. It also brought heavy rainfall, with rivers in Beihai, Qinzhou and Fangchenggang rising significantly. In all, 7 people lost their lives in China. Total economic losses were counted to be CN¥1.52 billion (US$243 million).

=== Vietnam ===
In Vietnam, the typhoon moved along the Tonkin Gulf, ravaging the coastal provinces of Nghệ An, Thanh Hóa, Ninh Bình and Thái Bình before making landfall 20 kilometers west of Halong Bay on October 29. A weather station on Hon Dau Island recorded sustained winds of 130 km/h (81 mph). A station in Thái Bình City recorded sustained winds of 112 km/h (69 mph) and gusts of 162 km/h (101 mph), while the Văn Lý meteorological station (at coordinates 20°07'17.0"N, 106°18'10.8"E in Nam Định province) recorded sustained winds of 108 km/h (67 mph) and gusts of 155 km/h (96 mph). Rainfall in some areas of northern Vietnam exceeded 300 mm, with Quảng Hà (Quảng Ninh) receiving 375 mm, Cửa Cấm (Haiphong) receiving 334 mm, and Thái Bình City receiving 404 mm. A 180 m (590 ft) tall mast tower in Nam Định collapsed during the storm. A total of eight people were killed in the country while three others were listed as missing. Another 90 people were injured in various accidents related to the typhoon. In all, 429 homes collapsed and 55,251 were damaged while about 95,000 hectares (235,000 acres) of crops were flooded. The storm caused ₫11 trillion (US$530 million, 2012 USD) in damage.

== See also ==
- Weather of 2012
- Tropical cyclones in 2012
- Typhoon Ike (1984) — impacted the same area
- Typhoon Betty (1987)
- Typhoon Mike (1990) — impacted the same area but weaker
- Typhoon Nepartak (2003) — took a similar path
- Typhoon Haiyan (2013) — took a similar path after striking the Philippines
- Typhoon Meranti (2016) — a stronger typhoon which took a similar path curvature
- Tropical Storm Son-Tinh (2018) — another storm with the same name that struck the same areas
