= Typhoon Meranti =

Pacific typhoon in 2016

Typhoon Meranti (Ferdie)
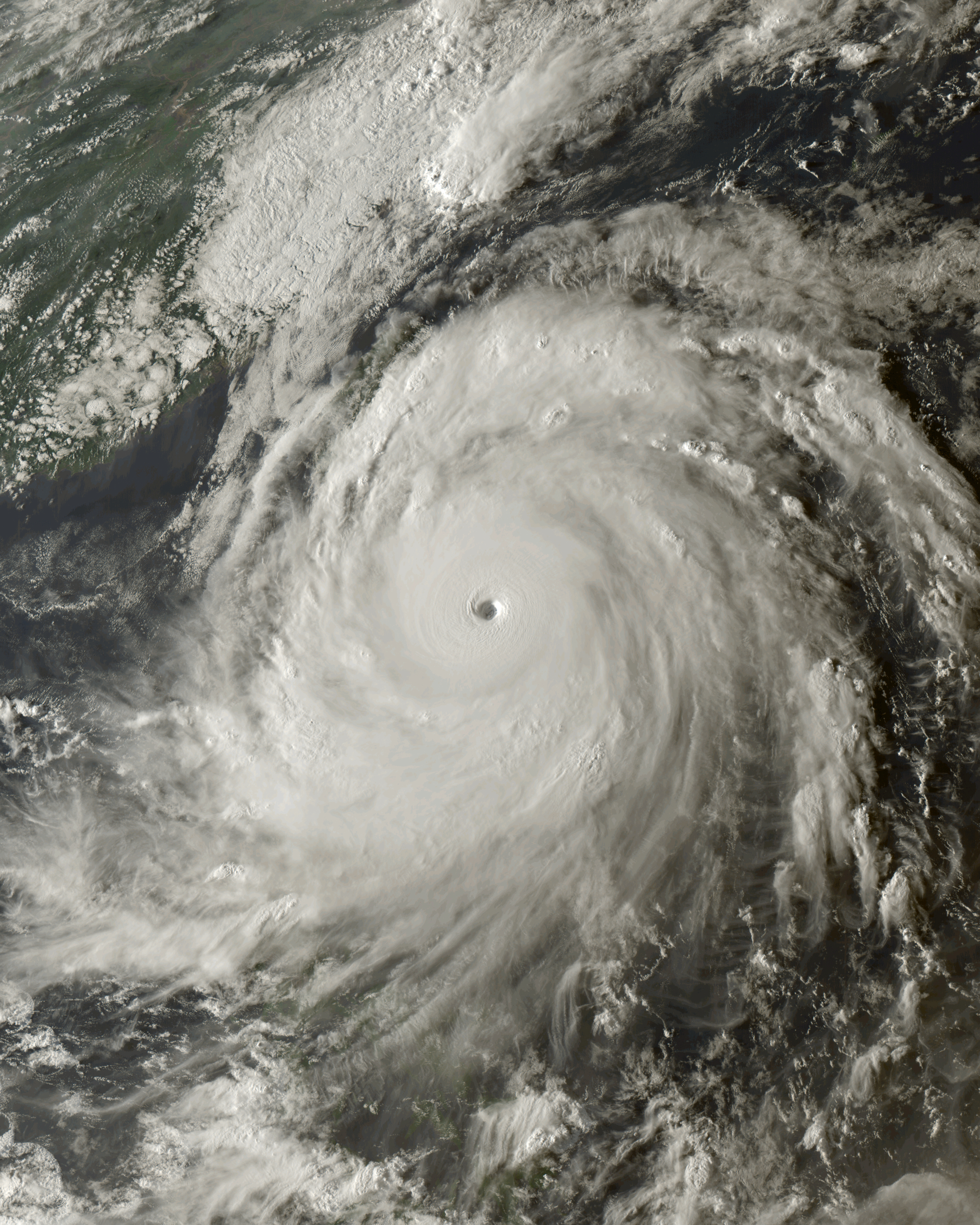
- Meranti near peak intensity on September 13

Meteorological history
- Formed: September 8, 2016
- Dissipated: September 17, 2016

Violent typhoon
- 10-minute sustained (JMA)
- Highest winds: 220 km/h (140 mph)
- Lowest pressure: 890 hPa (mbar); 26.28 inHg

Category 5-equivalent super typhoon
- 1-minute sustained (SSHWS/JTWC)
- Highest winds: 315 km/h (195 mph)
- Lowest pressure: 895 hPa (mbar); 26.43 inHg

Overall effects
- Fatalities: 47
- Damage: $4.79 billion (2016 USD)
- Areas affected: Philippines, Taiwan, China, South Korea
- IBTrACS
- Part of the 2016 Pacific typhoon season

Typhoon Meranti, (Note: The name Meranti (Malay: meranti, [məranti]) was contributed by Malaysia and refers to trees of the genus Shorea in Malay.) known in the Philippines as Typhoon Ferdie, was one of the most intense tropical cyclones on record. Meranti, which later impacted Batanes, Taiwan, and Fujian in mid September 2016, formed as a tropical depression on September 8 near the island of Guam. Tracking to the west northwest, Meranti gradually intensified until September 11, at which point it began a period of rapid intensification.

Continuing to rapidly intensify, it became a super typhoon early on September 12, as it passed through the Luzon Strait, ultimately reaching its peak intensity on September 13 with 1-minute sustained winds of 315 km/h (195 mph). Shortly afterwards, it passed directly over the island of Itbayat. Meranti passed to the south of Taiwan as a super typhoon, and began weakening steadily as a result of land interaction. By September 15, it struck Fujian Province as a Category 2-equivalent typhoon, becoming the strongest typhoon on record to impact the province. Upon moving inland, rapid weakening ensued and Meranti became extratropical the next day, dissipating shortly afterwards after it passed to the south of the Korean Peninsula.

The island of Itbayat sustained a direct hit from the super typhoon near its peak intensity, severing communications from the island for several days. However, no fatalities were reported on the island. The typhoon caused ₱244.99 million (US$5.16 million) in damage on the island. However, the most costly and direct impacts were felt in eastern China, where 45 people were killed from floods. Total economic cost in China reached ¥31.78 billion (US$4.76 billion). In total, Meranti caused US$4.79 billion in damage and killed 47 people.

During its lifetime, Meranti broke or tied several meteorological records. With JTWC-estimated 1-minute sustained winds of 315 km/h (195 mph), Meranti is tied with Haiyan in 2013, Goni in 2020 and Surigae in 2021 as the strongest typhoon on record by wind speed. Additionally, in terms of 1-minute sustained winds, the storm's landfall on the island of Itbayat shortly after peak intensity ties it with Haiyan as the second strongest landfalling tropical cyclone on record, only behind Goni. The estimated pressure of 890 mbar (26 inHg) was also the lowest on record in the Western Pacific since Megi in 2010.

== Meteorological history ==
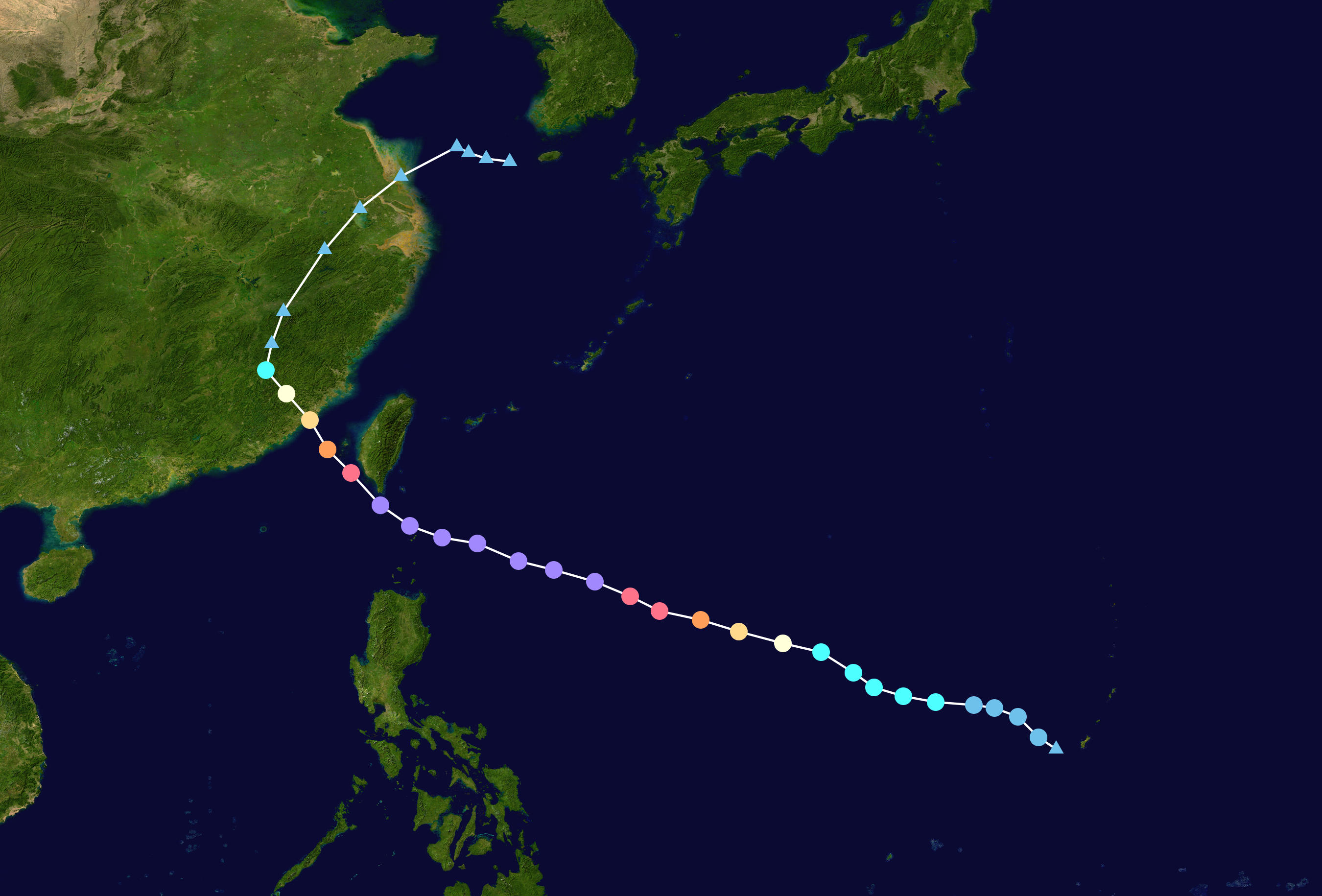
Map plotting the storm's track and intensity, according to the Saffir–Simpson scale Map key Saffir–Simpson scale Tropical depression (≤38 mph, ≤62 km/h) Tropical storm (39–73 mph, 63–118 km/h) Category 1 (74–95 mph, 119–153 km/h) Category 2 (96–110 mph, 154–177 km/h) Category 3 (111–129 mph, 178–208 km/h) Category 4 (130–156 mph, 209–251 km/h) Category 5 (≥157 mph, ≥252 km/h) Unknown Storm type Tropical cyclone Subtropical cyclone Extratropical cyclone, remnant low, tropical disturbance, or monsoon depression

On September 8, the Joint Typhoon Warning Center (JTWC) (Note: The Joint Typhoon Warning Center is a joint United States Navy – United States Air Force task force that issues tropical cyclone warnings for the western Pacific Ocean and other regions.) issued a Tropical Cyclone Formation Alert for an area of convection about 155 km (96 mi) west of Guam in the western Pacific Ocean. According to the agency, the circulation was rapidly consolidating alongside fragmented rainbands. At 18:00 UTC that night, the Japan Meteorological Agency (JMA) (Note: The Japan Meteorological Agency is the official Regional Specialized Meteorological Center for the western Pacific Ocean.) classified the system as a tropical depression. On the next day, the JTWC classified it as Tropical Depression 16W. By that time, the nascent system was moving slowly west-northwestward through a region of low wind shear, steered by ridges to the north and southwest. Increasing but fragmented convection, or thunderstorms, was fueled by unusually warm water temperatures and outflow from the south. At 06:00 UTC on September 10, the JMA upgraded the depression to Tropical Storm Meranti, which meandered over its own track while consolidating.

Northerly wind shear shifted the deepest convection to the south of Meranti's circulation, although rainbands and a central dense overcast continued to evolve as the wind shear decreased. By early on September 11, the storm's movement was steady to the west-northwest, south of the ridge. At 06:00 UTC that day, the JMA upgraded Meranti to typhoon status, and shortly thereafter the JTWC followed suit. The storm's structure continued to improve, with increased outflow. A small eye 9 km (5.6 mi) across developed within the spiraling thunderstorms, signaling that Meranti was rapidly intensifying. At 06:00 UTC on September 12, the JTWC upgraded Meranti to a super typhoon, with 1-minute maximum sustained winds of 240 km/h (150 mph). Six hours later, the JTWC estimated 1-minute sustained winds of 285 km/h (180 mph), equivalent to Category 5 on the Saffir–Simpson scale, while noting "an extremely favorable environment", and that the eye became even more symmetric within intense convection. Outflow enhanced by a strong anticyclone over Meranti fueled the intensification, and the typhoon peaked in intensity on September 13 while passing through the Luzon Strait.

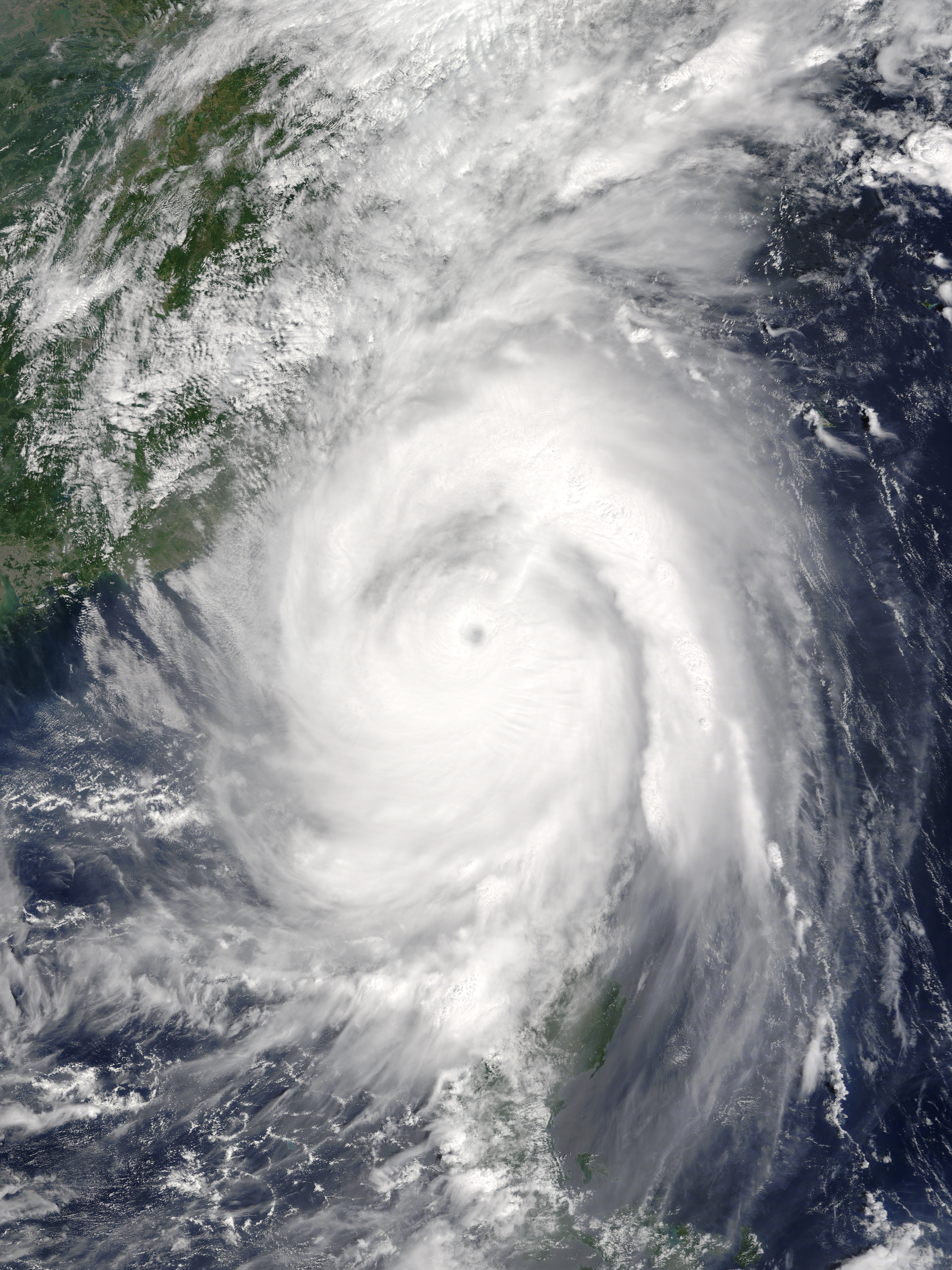
Typhoon Meranti due south of Taiwan on September 14

The JMA estimated peak 10-minute sustained winds of 220 km/h (140 mph) and a minimum barometric pressure of 890 hPa (mbar; 26.28 inHg), while the JTWC estimated peak 1-minute sustained winds of 315 km/h (195 mph). Based on the JMA pressure estimate, Meranti was among the most intense tropical cyclones. The JTWC wind estimate made Meranti the strongest tropical cyclone by wind speed worldwide in 2016, surpassing Cyclone Winston, which had peak sustained winds of 285 km/h (180 mph) when it struck Fiji in February. Late on September 13, the storm made landfall on the 83 km^{2} (32 sq mi) island of Itbayat in the Philippine province of Batanes shortly after attaining its peak intensity, with 1-minute sustained winds of 305 km/h (190 mph). A weather station on the island measured 10-minute sustained winds of 180 km/h (110 mph) and a concurrent pressure of 933.6 mbar (27.57 inHg) around 17:00 UTC before being destroyed. Just south of Itbayat in Basco, sustained winds peaked at 144 km/h (89 mph), gusts reached 252 km/h (157 mph), and a minimum pressure of 935.4 mbar (27.62 inHg) was observed in the eyewall.

At around 03:15 CST on September 15 (19:15 UTC on September 14), Meranti slammed into the Xiang'an District, Xiamen, Fujian, with measured 2-minute sustained winds of 173 km/h (107 mph), making it the second strongest typhoon ever to make landfall in Fujian Province.

The system then degraded to a tropical depression by September 15, and subsequently transitioned into an extratropical cyclone near the Yangtze River delta on September 16. The remnants continued northeastward before dissipating near the Korean Peninsula on September 17.

== Impact ==
=== Philippines ===
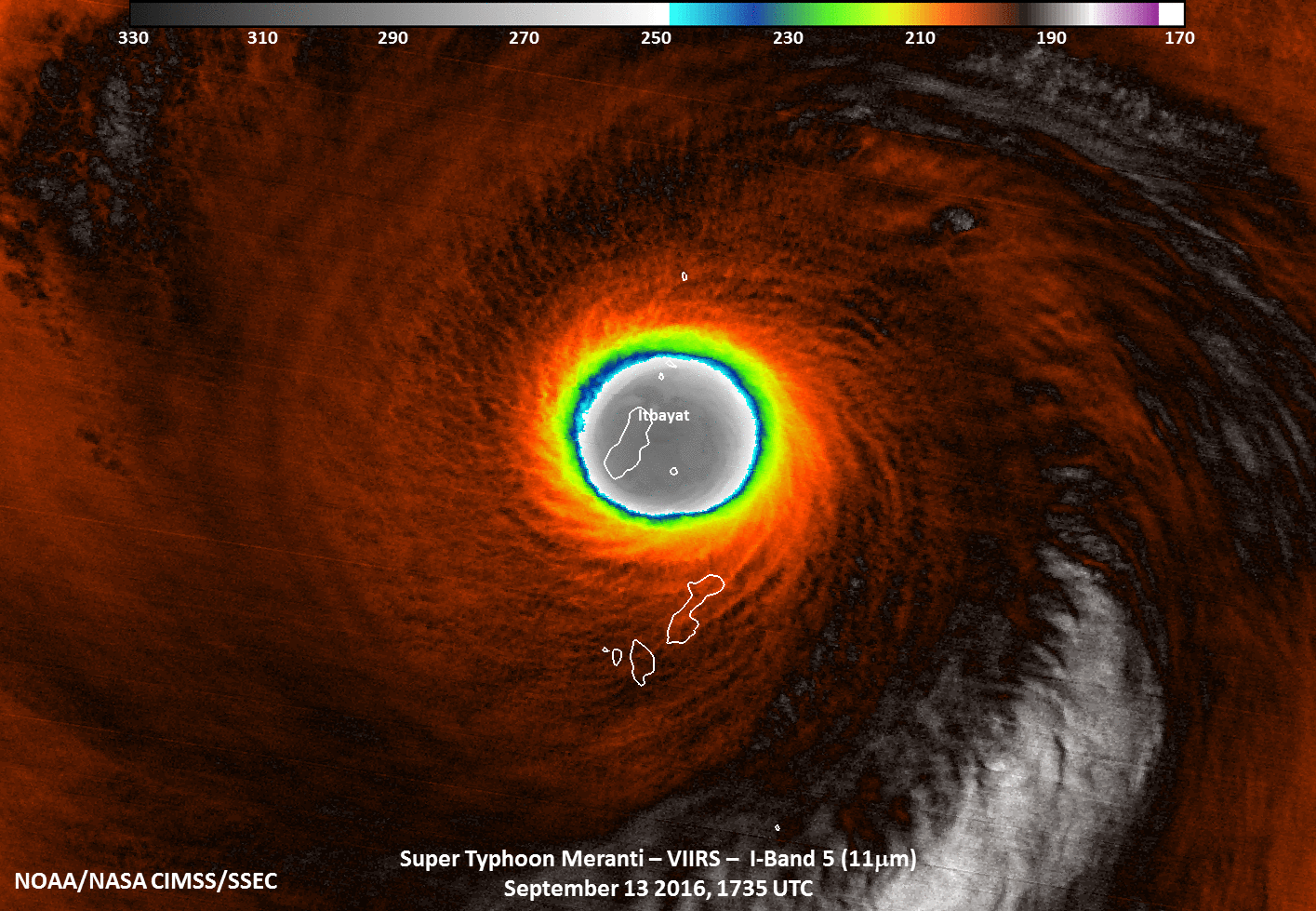
The eye of Meranti passed directly over Itbayat at 17:35 UTC on September 13.

Meranti struck the northernmost Philippine province of Batanes at peak strength, passing directly over the island of Itbayat; the island was left isolated after communications were lost during the storm on September 14. From text messages received by family members, residents in Itbayat reported their stone homes to be swaying during the height of the typhoon. Assessments as of September 17 indicated that 292 homes were destroyed and 932 were damaged across the Batanes. More than 10,000 people were affected by the storm, with many in dire need of water. A state of calamity was declared for the province on September 15. Total damage exceeded an approximate total of ₱244.99 million (US$5.16 million) as of September 24.

Government relief efforts reached Itbayat on September 18, reporting no casualties on the island.

=== Taiwan ===
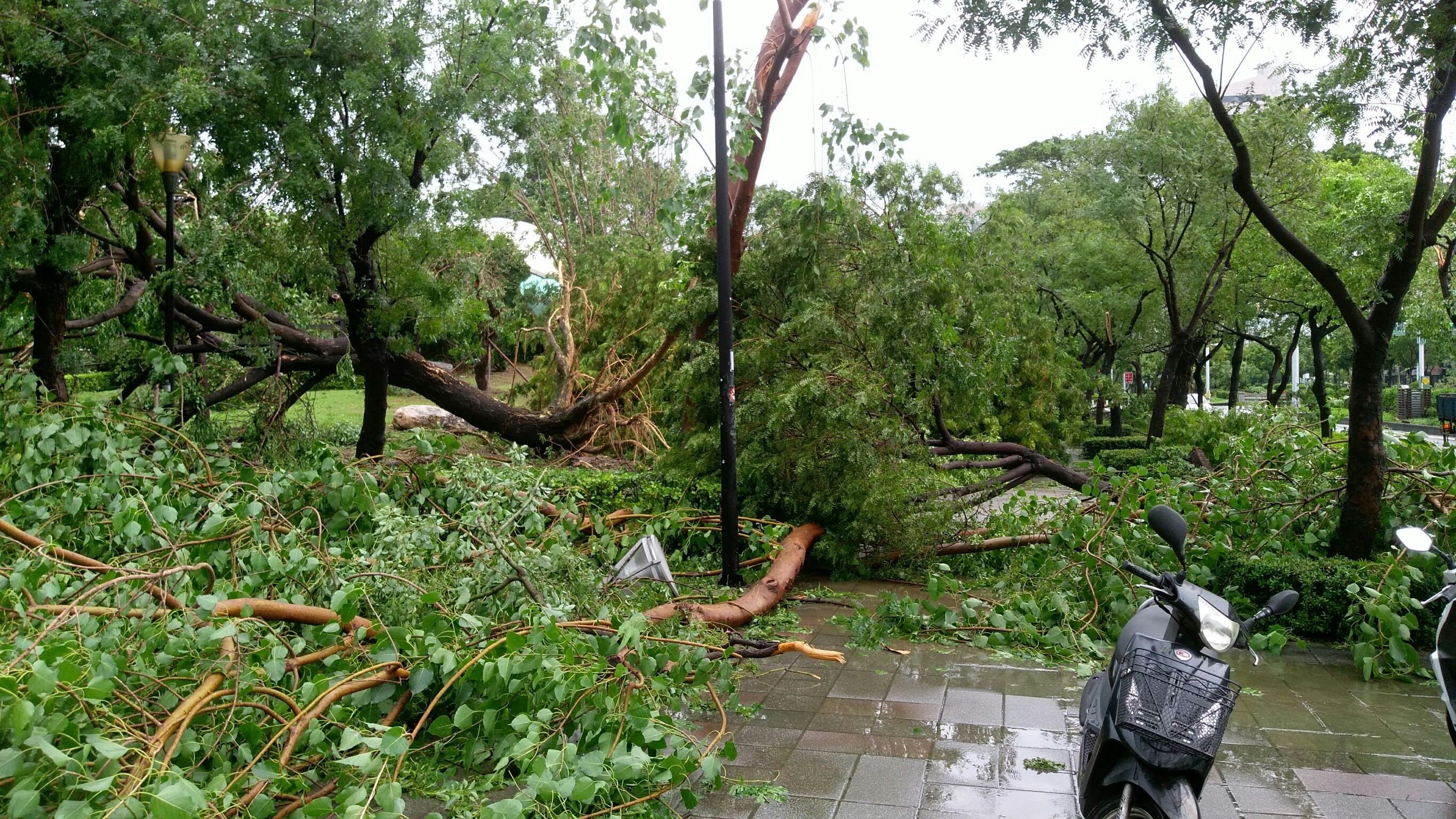
Tree damage in Birth Day Park, Kaohsiung

At least two people were killed in Taiwan. Nearly 1 million households lost power and 720,000 lost water supply. Agricultural damage exceeded NT$850 million (US$26.8 million). A small lighthouse in Taitung County collapsed and rough seas unmoored 10 vessels in Kaohsiung Harbor.

=== Mainland China ===
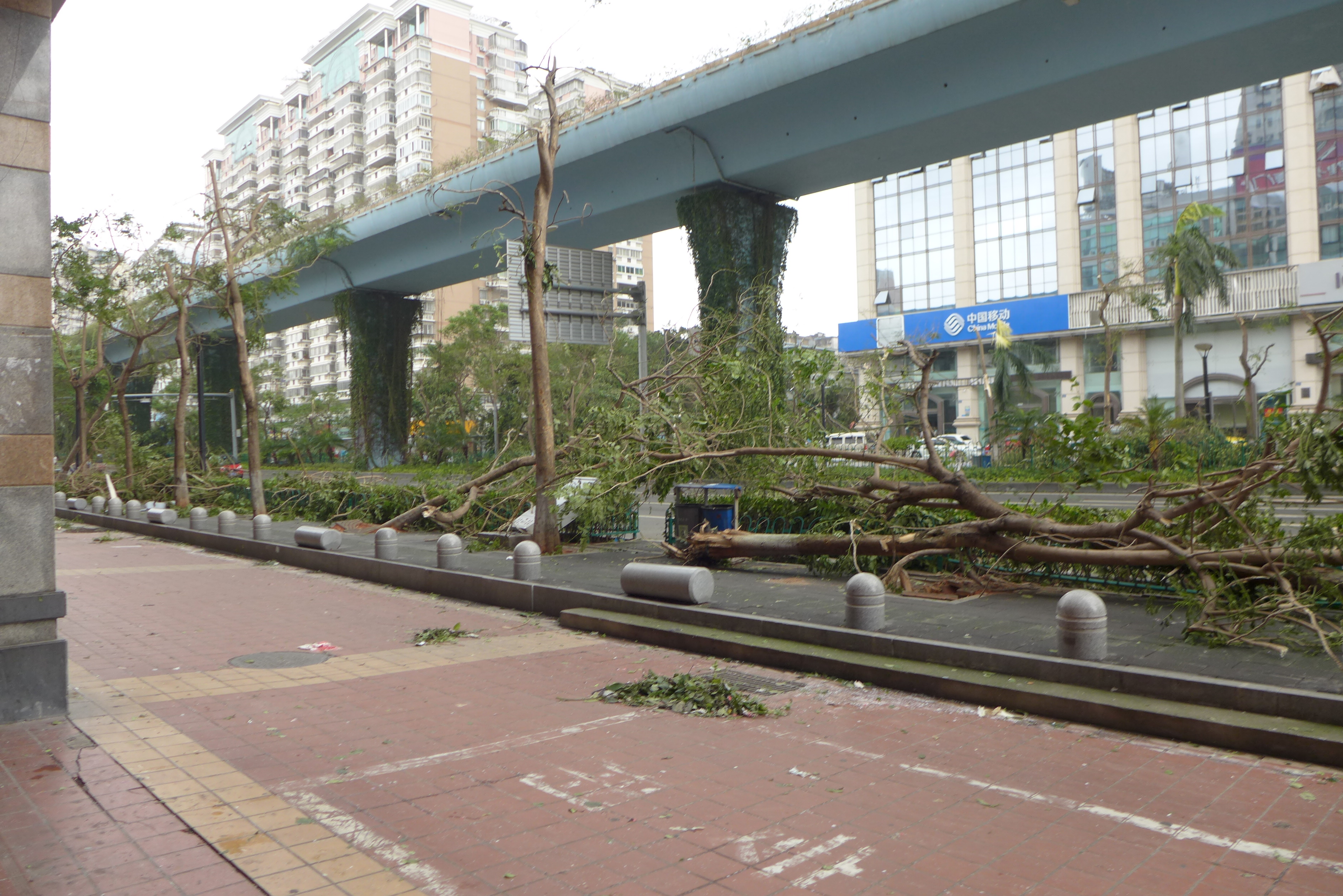
Trees and billboards were destroyed after Typhoon Meranti, Xiamen.

Typhoon Meranti wrought extensive damage across Fujian and Zhejiang provinces. In Fujian, the storm killed 18 people and left 11 others missing. Typhoon-force winds and flash floods caused tremendous damage, leaving ¥31.78 billion (US$4.76 billion) in economic losses and killed 45 people across East China. In Fujian, the cities of Xiamen, Quanzhou and Zhangzhou were left paralyzed in Meranti's wake, while flash floods in Yongchun County destroyed an 871-year-old bridge that was classified as a protected heritage site. Flooding in Zhejiang claimed at least ten lives and left four others missing. At least 902 homes collapsed and 1.5 million people in the province were affected.

== Retirement ==
During the 49th annual session from the ESCAP/WMO Typhoon Committee during February 2017, the name Meranti was retired from the rotating lists of names. In March 2018, the Typhoon Committee chose Nyatoh as its replacement name.

== See also ==
- Weather of 2016
- Tropical cyclones in 2016
