= Typhoon Nina (1987) =

Pacific typhoon

Typhoon Nina (Sisang)
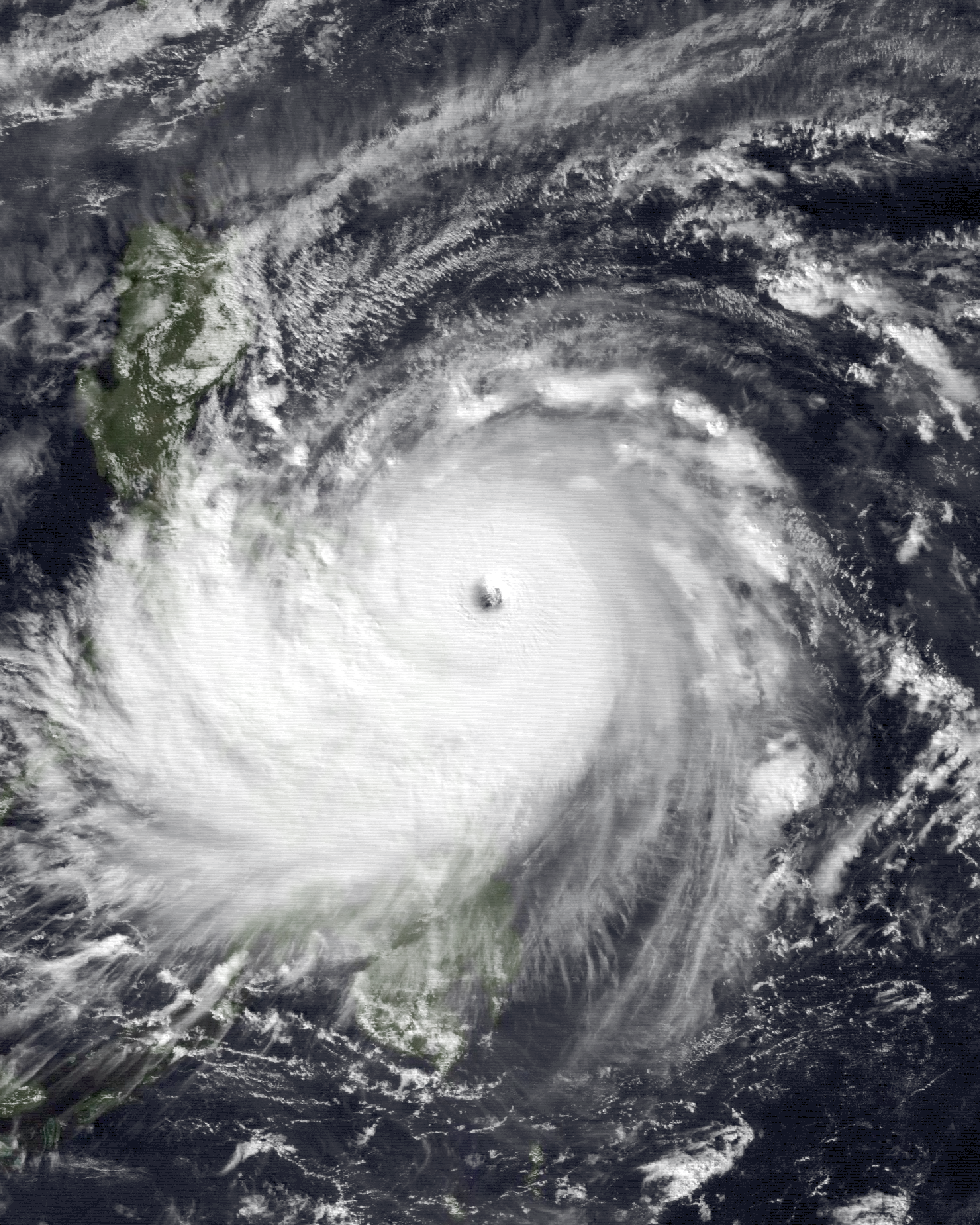
- Typhoon Nina approaching the Philippines at peak intensity on November 25

Meteorological history
- Formed: November 19, 1987
- Dissipated: November 30, 1987

Very strong typhoon
- 10-minute sustained (JMA)
- Highest winds: 165 km/h (105 mph)
- Lowest pressure: 930 hPa (mbar); 27.46 inHg

Category 5-equivalent super typhoon
- 1-minute sustained (SSHWS/JTWC)
- Highest winds: 270 km/h (165 mph)
- Lowest pressure: 891 hPa (mbar); 26.31 inHg

Overall effects
- Fatalities: 1,036 total
- Damage: ≥$84.5 million (1987 USD)
- Areas affected: Chuuk Lagoon; Philippines; South China
- IBTrACS
- Part of the 1987 Pacific typhoon season

Typhoon Nina, known as Typhoon Sisang by PAGASA, was a deadly tropical cyclone that struck the Philippines in 1987. Typhoon Nina originated from an area of convection near the Marshall Islands in mid-November 1987. It gradually became better organized, and on November 19, was first classified as a tropical cyclone. Moving west-northwest, Nina attained tropical storm intensity that evening. Late on November 20, Nina passed through the Chuuk Lagoon in the Federated States of Micronesia. After a brief pause in intensification, Nina intensified into a typhoon on November 22. Two days later, the typhoon intensified suddenly, before attaining its peak 10 minute intensity of 165 km/h (105 mph; 90 kn). During the afternoon of November 25, Nina moved ashore in Southern Luzon at the same intensity. It gradually weakened over land, before entering the South China Sea and turning to the north. By November 30, Nina dissipated.

Across the Chuuk Lagoon, four people were killed and damage ranged from $30–$40 million (1987 USD). In the capital of Weno, 85% of dwellings and 50% of government buildings were damaged. Throughout the atoll, at least 1,000 people were rendered homeless, approximately 1,000 houses were damaged, and 39 injuries were reported. While crossing the Philippines, Nina brought extensive damage to the northern portion of the island group. The town of Matnog sustained the worst damage from the typhoon, where 287 people died. Sixty-one people died in the city of Sorsogon, where 98% of all structures were either damaged or destroyed. Four hundred people died, 80% of all crops were destroyed, and 90% of all homes were either damaged or destroyed in the Sorsogon province. Nearby, in the Albay province, 73 people were killed. Throughout both the Albay and Sorsogon provinces, four-fifths of all schools and half of all public infrastructure were destroyed. Elsewhere, in Boac, 80% of homes lost their roofs. In Bacacay, 18 of the village's 200 homes were destroyed. However, the capital city of Manila avoided the brunt of the typhoon. Throughout the Philippines, approximately 114,000 people sought shelter, approximately 90,000 houses were destroyed, leaving more than 150,000 homeless. Nationwide, damage from the storm totaled $54.5 million and 979 people perished.

== Meteorological history ==
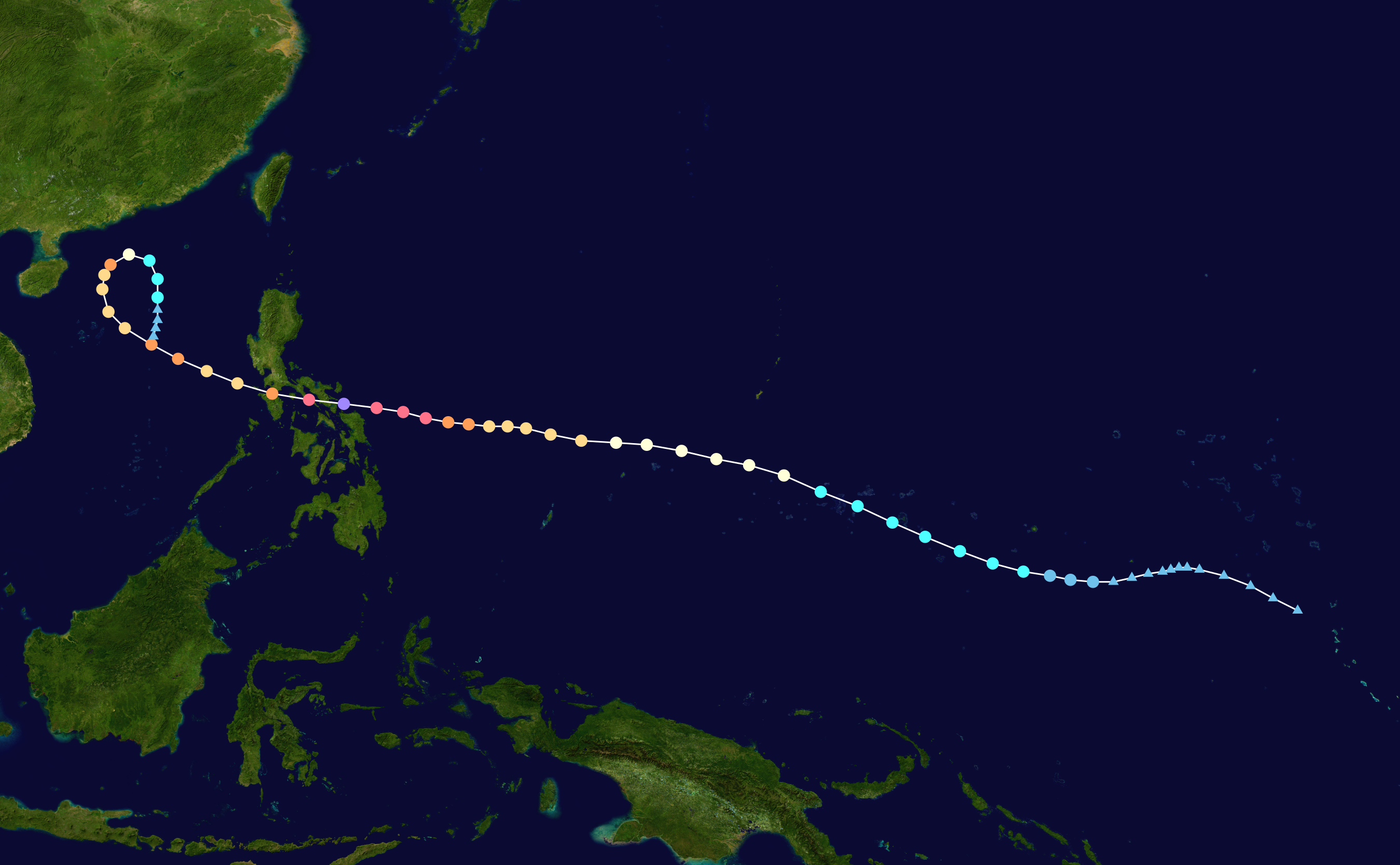
Map plotting the storm's track and intensity, according to the Saffir–Simpson scale Map key Saffir–Simpson scale Tropical depression (≤38 mph, ≤62 km/h) Tropical storm (39–73 mph, 63–118 km/h) Category 1 (74–95 mph, 119–153 km/h) Category 2 (96–110 mph, 154–177 km/h) Category 3 (111–129 mph, 178–208 km/h) Category 4 (130–156 mph, 209–251 km/h) Category 5 (≥157 mph, ≥252 km/h) Unknown Storm type Tropical cyclone Subtropical cyclone Extratropical cyclone, remnant low, tropical disturbance, or monsoon depression

An area of convection developed within near the Marshall Islands in mid-November. Initially, convection waxed and waned, but on November 17, the Joint Typhoon Warning Center (JTWC) started tracking the system. At this time, the system developed deep convection as well as good outflow. The JTWC issued a Tropical Cyclone Formation Alert (TCFA) at 0100 UTC on November 19 due to a significant increase in organization. Five hours later, the Japan Meteorological Agency (JMA) started monitoring the system. (Note: The Japan Meteorological Agency is the official Regional Specialized Meteorological Center for the western Pacific Ocean.) Continuing to rapidly become better organized while moving west-northwest, the cyclone was classified as a tropical depression by the JTWC at midday. On the evening of November 19, both the JTWC and the JMA upgraded the system to Tropical Storm, prompting JTWC to name the system as Nina, shortly after developing banding features. (Note: Wind estimates from the JMA and most other basins throughout the world are sustained over 10 minutes, while estimates from the United States-based Joint Typhoon Warning Center are sustained over 1 minute. 10-minute winds are about 1.14 times the amount of 1-minute winds.) Initially forecast by the JTWC to move slowly, instead, Nina accelerated while gradually intensifying. At 1600 UTC on November 20, Tropical Storm Nina passed 75 km (45 mi; 40 nmi) south of Weno Island in the Chuuk Lagoon. Two hours later, the JMA upgraded Nina to a severe tropical storm. After moving away from the island on the morning of November 21, the JTWC upgraded Nina to a typhoon at 1200 UTC, with the JMA following suit early on November 22. Shortly thereafter, Nina made its closest approach to Ulithi, passing 110 km (70 mi; 60 nmi) to the north. At 1600 UTC, Nina tracked about 175 km (110 mi; 95 nmi) north of Yap.

Typhoon Nina accelerated slightly as it traversed the open waters of the Philippine Sea. The storm continued to slowly deepen, though early on November 23, the system leveled off in intensity. That day, the Philippine Atmospheric, Geophysical and Astronomical Services Administration (PAGASA) also monitored the storm and assigned it with the local name Sisang, upon entering the Philippine Area of Responsibility. However, midday on November 24, Nina entered a phase of explosive intensification, at a rate of 1.33 mbar (0.039 inHg) an hour. Despite this, the JMA only increased the intensity slightly to 170 km/h (105 mph; 90 kn). After developing a well-defined eye, the JTWC reported that Nina attained its peak intensity of 270 km/h (170 mph; 145 kn), making it a low-end Category 5 system on the Saffir-Simpson Hurricane Wind Scale. At 1500 UTC on November 25, Nina moved ashore as it made landfall along the southern tip of Luzon at its peak intensity.

Despite land interaction, little change in strength occurred until 0000 UTC on November 26, at that time, the system began to weaken. After traversing Luzon and Mindoro, the JTWC reduced the wind speed of the typhoon to 110 mph (175 km/h; 95 kn). Although no eye was visible on satellite imagery, radar imagery indicated that an eye was present, but cloud-filed; henceforth, the JTWC increased the intensity of Nina to 185 km/h (115 mph; 100 kn), equivalent to a weak Category 3 hurricane. According to the JMA, however, Nina never re-intensified. By 0000 UTC on November 27, the low and mid level circulations began to decouple, deeply thwarting many JTWC forecasters. During this time, the cyclone posed a serious threat to Southern China and Hong Kong; Nina instead veered northward while gradually weakening. By midday on November 27, the JMA had reduced the intensity of Nina to 130 km/h (80 mph; 70 kn). Early on November 28, an eye once again became visible on satellite imagery. However, no re-intensification occurred. By the afternoon, increased wind shear took toll on the cyclone, causing Nina to become less organized due to deep convection being sheared off to the east-northeast. Thus, the JTWC expected Nina to move into the Luzon Straits and rapidly transitioned into an extratropical cyclone. After meandering within the South China Sea, Nina turned south, before dissipating on November 29; the JMA continued to monitor its remnants until 0000 UTC on November 30.

== Preparation and impact ==
=== Federated States of Micronesia ===
While passing near Truk, which has a population of 42,000, Typhoon Nina inflicted heavy crop damage on the area. In the capital of Weno, 85% of homes and 50% of government buildings were damaged. There, communication lines were downed and hundreds of people were evacuated. Throughout the atoll, four people died, including a woman and a 14-year-old boy killed by a falling breadfruit tree and an 11-year-old girl died after her leg was struck by a piece of flying metal. One person was reported missing. Over 1,000 people were rendered homeless while roughly 1,000 homes were damaged. Damaged from the storm ranged from $30–40 million (1987 USD) and 39 were wounded.

=== Philippines ===
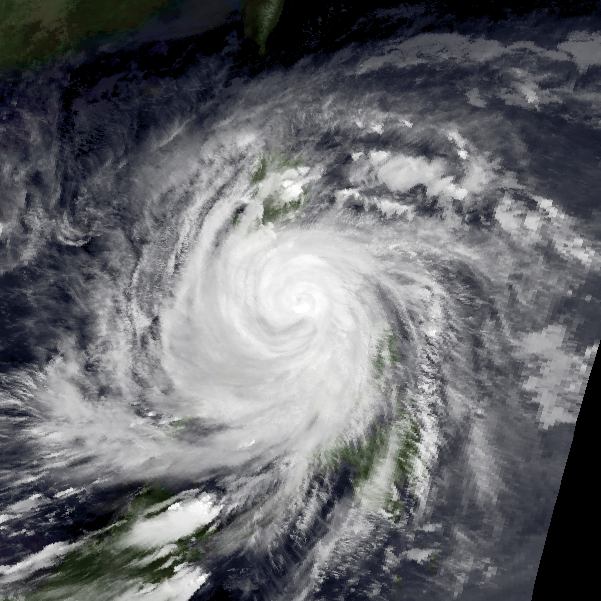
Nina traversing the Philippines late on November 25

Prior to landfall, around 10 provinces, including most of Luzon, was placed under a typhoon alert. However, many fisherman ignored the alerts and refused to flee to higher ground. Furthermore, Philippine Air Lines cancelled 21 domestic flights and three international flights. Numerous other flights were delayed. Local authorities also suspended school classes.

Typhoon Nina brought widespread damage to much of the northern Philippines. It was the strongest system to strike the archipelago since Typhoon Irma in 1981. The capital city of Manila was spared the worst of Nina. There, only minor damage and power outages were reported, though 800 were evacuated to shelters due to flooding and the city's airport closed. Two men were crushed to death in Lucena City. The worst effects of the storm were felt in Matnog, where 287 people drowned due to storm surge. In nearby Sorsogon City, 61 fatalities occurred, where 98% of the city's buildings were damaged or destroyed and its supply of drinking water was cut off. Throughout the Sorsogon province, 80% of all crops were destroyed and 90% of all homes were either damaged or destroyed. Province-wide, 400 people died. In the Albay province, 73 people were killed. Throughout both the Albay and Sorsogon provinces combined, 80% of all schools and 50% of all public buildings were demolished.

Elsewhere, seven casualties occurred in the Laguna province, while one person perished each in San Pablo, Batangas, Marinduque and Mindoro Oriental. Thirty-two people were killed in the Camarines Sur province and 23 other people died in Camarines Norte. Five others were killed in the Masbate province, and one died in Marinduque. In Boac, the capital of Marinduque, 80% of all dwellings lost their roofs and damage was severe to churches, schools and city buildings. In Bacacay, situated to the southeast of Legaspi, all but 15 of the town's 200 dwellings were leveled. Although there were no deaths, Samar Island also suffered severe damage. Offshore, five fisherman perished and a tugboat and cargo ship were rendered missing due to rough seas. Nina also brought widespread power outages to most of Luzon; consequently, trading on the nation's two biggest stock exchange was suspended for November 26.

Overall, around 114,000 persons were evacuated to shelters, 153,339 were listed homeless, and 1,075 were wounded. A total of 90,173 homes were demolished due to Nina while an additional 109,633 were partially destroyed. Nationwide, 979 people were killed. In all, damage from the storm totaled $54.5 million (1987 USD), (Note: All Philippine currencies are converted to United States Dollars using Philippines Measuring worth with an exchange rate of the year 1987.) $7.9 million of which occurred along the Bicol Region.

=== Hong Kong and Macau ===
Although Nina was rapidly weakening over the South China Sea, the storm brought 4.7 mm (0.19 in) of rain to Hong Kong, prompting a tropical cyclone signal for nearby Macau. Temperatures at the Hong Kong Observatory fell to 9.9 °C, and wind speed was recorded at 53 mph (85 km/h) at Waglan Island.

=== China ===
An intense surge of winter monsoon affected the southern coast of China.

== Aftermath ==
Due to the damage wrought by Nina, President Corazon Aquino declared four Luzon provinces a disaster area. Initially, only 11 provinces were declared a state of emergency, but by November 29, this total increased to 17. United States Ambassador Nicholas Platt released $25,000 in emergency aid and sent officials to help with relief efforts. The American Red Cross also provided $24,000 worth of aid to post-storm victims. The Roman Catholic Church also provided $160,000 worth of food to the nation. Additionally, Social Welfare and Development Secretary Mita Pardo de Tavera donated $50,000 for emergency disaster relief, though many locals complained that this aid was too little and too late. Around 11,000 lb (5,000 kg) of rice was donated for use in eight provinces, and on December 1, an additional 35,000 lb (16,000 kg) of aid was airlifted to the region. Belgium also launched a four-month program to help 380,000 post-storm victims. Most flights in and out of Manila had returned to a normal schedule by November 28. In all, nine countries and several foreign Red Cross organizations responded by providing aid, totaling roughly $700,000 worth of value, mostly from Japan. The name Sisang was retrospectively retired by PAGASA from the list of tropical cyclones in the country; it was replaced by Sendang.

== See also ==
- List of near-Equatorial tropical cyclones
- Typhoon Utor (Seniang; 2006) – another late-season typhoon which affected the same areas as Nina.
- Typhoon Son-Tinh (Ofel; 2012) – a typhoon that affected central Philippines as a tropical storm in October 2012.
- Typhoon Bopha (Pablo; 2012) – an intense near-Equatorial typhoon which struck Mindanao in late-2012.
- Typhoon Haiyan (Yolanda; 2013) – had a similar path and also caused widespread destruction in the Philippines in November 2013.
