= List of Philippine typhoons (1963–1999) =

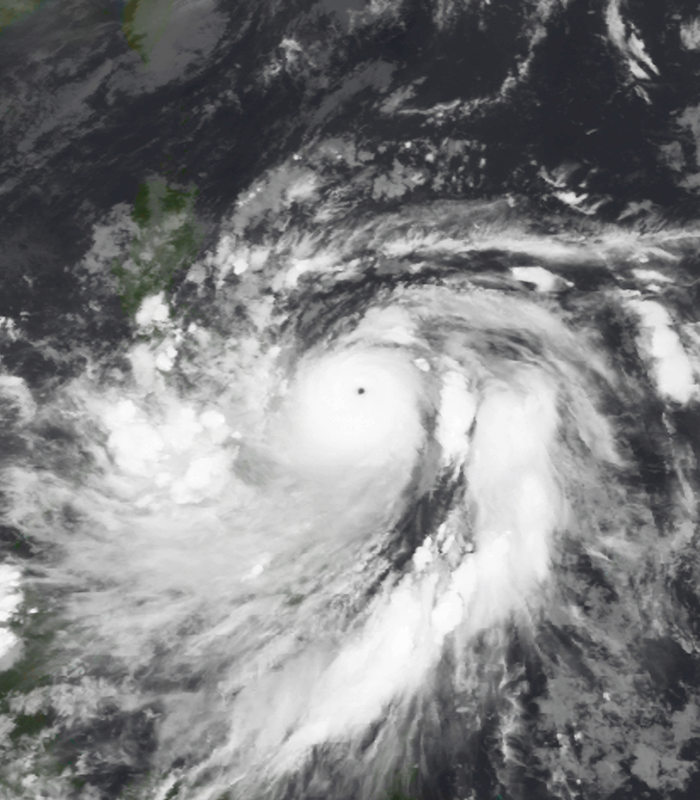
Typhoon Loleng (Babs) to the east of the Philippines in October 20, 1998

The Philippines is archipelagic country in Southeast Asia, located in the northwest Pacific Ocean. It consists of 7,641 islands. The country is known to be "the most exposed country in the world to tropical storms", with about twenty tropical cyclones entering the Philippine area of responsibility each year. In the Philippine languages, tropical cyclones are generally called bagyo.

Climatologically, in the Northwest Pacific basin, most tropical cyclones develop between May and October. However, the Philippines can experience a tropical cyclone anytime in the year, with the most storms during the months of June to September. This article includes any tropical cyclone of any intensity that affected the Philippines between 1963 and 1999.

== 1963–1969 ==
=== 1963 ===
- June 9–10, 1963: Tropical Storm Rose (Bebeng) closed in the northwestern coast of Luzon, bringing rainfall.
- June 26–28, 1963: Typhoon Trix (Diding) traversed Luzon.
- July 19, 1963: Typhoon Agnes (Ising) made landfall over the northern portion of Cagayan.
- August 13–15, 1963: Typhoon Carmen (Luding) impacted most of Luzon as a Category 4 typhoon.
- September 7, 1963: Typhoon Faye (Neneng) passed over the extreme Northern islands of the country.
- December 12–13, 1963: Tropical Storm Phyllis (Sisang) affected the western coast of the country.
- December 15–16, 1963: Tropical Storm Rita (Trining) and its outflow affected the eastern portion of the country.

=== 1964 ===
- June 29–30, 1964: Typhoon Winnie (Dading) passed over Southern Luzon and Manila, which was experiencing the worst of its damage since 1882. Approximately 500,000 people were rendered homeless in the Manila area and in the central provinces of Luzon following the razing of thousands of homes; 10 people were killed by flooding in the capital. This was the first time PAGASA retired a typhoon name afterwards.
- July 9, 1964: Tropical Storm Cora (Huaning) neared Samar before dissipating. Storm warnings were issued in southeastern Luzon with Cora 100 km (60 mi) east of Samar, with forecasts projecting stormy conditions in the region and in other islands in the east-central Philippines.
- July 17, 1964: Typhoon Elsie (Lusing) battered Luzon, causing extensive flooding in Manila.
- August 6–7, 1964: Typhoon Ida (Seniang) impacted Northern Luzon as a strong typhoon. Streets in Manila were flooded to waist-height from heavy rains and high waves.
- September 3, 1964: Typhoon Ruby (Yoning) prompted the PAGASA to issue storm warnings over northern Luzon, Batanes and the Babuyan Group of Islands.
- September 9, 1964: Typhoon Sally (Aring) passed by over the northern islands of Luzon with winds of 114 km/h (71 mph) being recorded there. PAGASA raised only a Tropical Cyclone Signal No. 2 there.
- September 28–29, 1964: Tropical Storm Billie (Kayang) caused severe flooding over the Bicol Region and Manila. 16 people were killed in Camarines Sur.
- October 5, 1964: Typhoon Clara (Dorang) made landfall over Auror province.
- October 8–9, 1964: Typhoon Dot (Enang) traversed the Cagayan and Ilocos regions.
- October 20–21, 1964: Tropical Storm Georgia (Grasing) made landfall over Quezon province.
- November 19–21, 1964: Typhoon Louise (Ining) made landfall over Surigao del Sur as a powerful typhoon, impacting Mindanao and much of Visayas, killing at least 577 people in total.
- November 20–23, 1964: Tropical Storm Marge (Liling) moved through Luzon only as a much more weaker system, alongside Typhoon Louise.
- November 27–28, 1964: Tropical Storm Nora (Moning) moved eastward and affected Visayas and Calabarzon.
- December 13–14, 1964: Typhoon Opal (Naning) affected much of Luzon as a strong typhoon, killing 26 people.

== 1970s ==
1970:

October 13–14, 1970: Typhoon Joan (Sening) lashed Luzon and particularly Visayas, killing 770 total.

October 19–21, 1970: Typhoon Kate (Titang) was one of the tropical cyclones closest to form on the equator, makes landfall to Mindanao killing 631 people in total.

November 19–21, 1970: Typhoon Patsy (Yoling) made landfall in Luzon and killed 264 people.

== 1980s ==
=== 1984 ===
August 26–29, 1984: Tropical Storm June (Maring) made landfall in Luzon just days before Typhoon Ike (Nitang) made more deadly and devastating landfalls.

September 1–4, 1984: Typhoon Ike (Nitang) devastated Visayas, Mindanao and some parts of Southern Luzon; deaths from the typhoon were 1,474.

October 28–31, 1984: Severe Tropical Storm Warren (Reming) though didn’t make any landfalls, its outflow caused intense rainfall over parts of Visayas, Palawan and Luzon. Killing 69 people.

November 5–7, 1984: Typhoon Agnes (Undang) made several landfalls across Visayas region, killing 895 people.

=== 1985 ===
- June 22, 1985: Typhoon Hal (Kuring) prompted the PAGASA to issue typhoon alerts for much of Luzon, enduring widespread flooding and significant crop damage.
- June 28, 1985: Despite the storm remaining well offshore, Typhoon Irma (Daling) dropped heavy rainfall over the eastern portion of the country. Over 30 in (710 mm) of rain fell over parts of Luzon.
- July 4–5, 1985: Tropical Depression Elang passed Southern Luzon and Central Visayas.
- September 3, 1985: Typhoon Tess (Miling) moved over Luzon, with four being killed due to flooding.
- October 11–12, 1985: Tropical Depression Rubing caused rough waves, resulting in 70 fishing boats that sunk or were destroyed in Iloilo.
- October 17–18, 1985: Typhoon Dot (Saling) impacted much of Luzon with strong winds and flooding. Nationwide, damage totaled $104.9 million, and the typhoon killed 88 people.
- October 25–27, 1985: Tropical Storm Faye (Tasing) brought heavy rainfall over much of Luzon and Visayas.

=== 1986 ===
- July 9, 1986: Typhoon Peggy (Gading) struck northeastern Luzon. Many landslides existed from torrential rainfall, with flooding up to 10 ft (3 m) deep.
- August 29 – September 3, 1986: Typhoon Wayne (Miding) brought torrential rainfall due to its erratic path.
- October 7–8, 1986: Tropical Depression Oyang affected Central Luzon, with total of 16 being killed and damages totalling up to US$4 million.
- October 11–13, 1986: Typhoon Ellen (Pasing) affected Visayas and the western coast of Luzon.
- October 18, 1986: Tropical Storm Georgia (Ruping) passed by the archipelago of Visayas.
- November 7, 1986: Tropical Storm Herbert (Tering) traversed Visayas, bringing light to moderate rainfall.
- November 12–13, 1986: Tropical Storm Ida (Uding) passed by Visayas.

=== 1987 ===
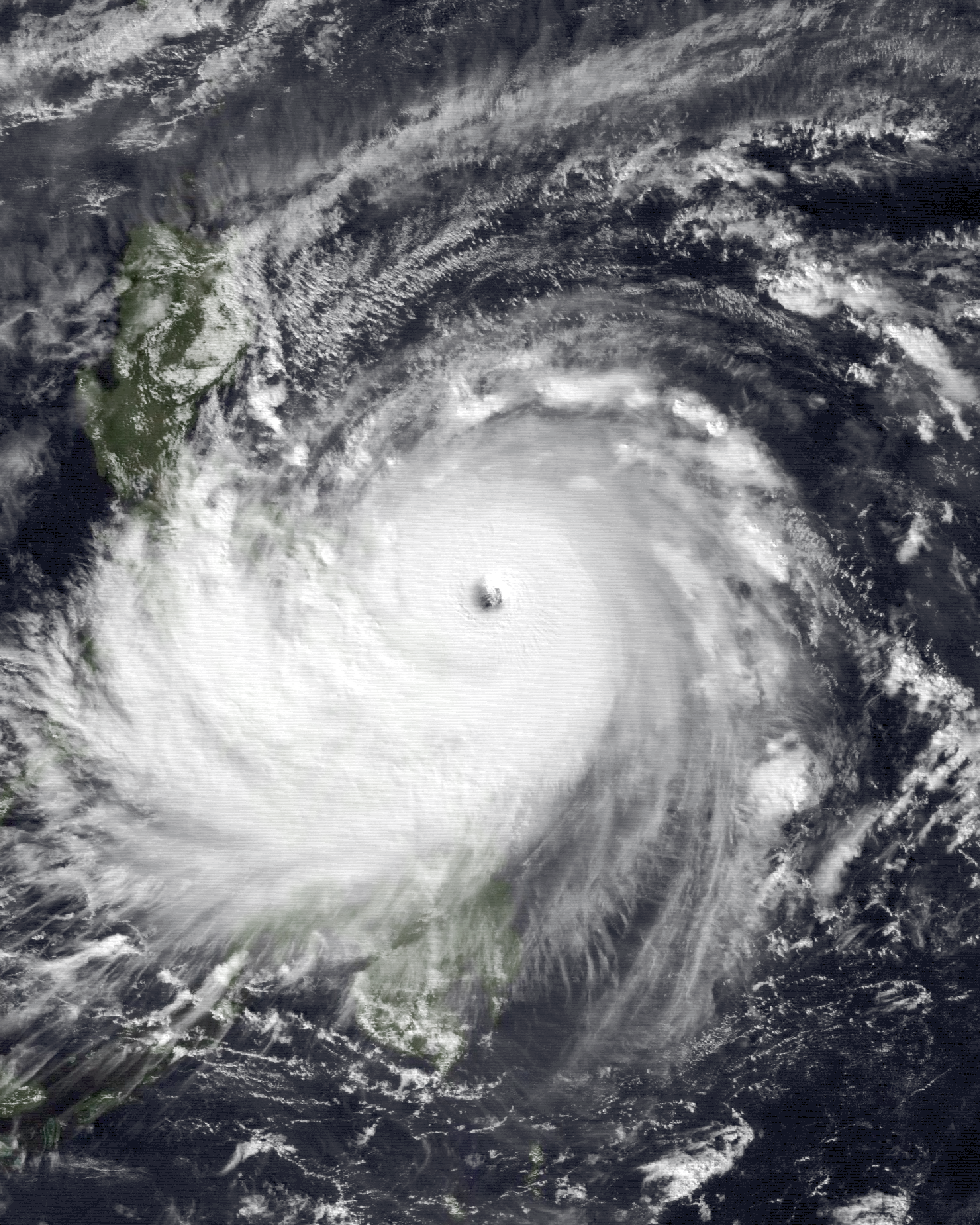
Typhoon Sisang (Nina) at its peak strength prior to landfall on November 25, 1987

- July 11, 1987: Although Typhoon Thelma (Katring) remained well offshore the Philippines, storm surge associated with its circulation swept away some 500 houses in the southern islands of the Philippines, leaving over 3,500 people homeless.
- August 11–12, 1987: Typhoon Betty (Herming) struck Visayas as a powerful typhoon, bringing in widespread flooding and severe destruction. Roughly 400,000 people were directly affected by the storm. Overall, 94 people were killed and 324 others were wounded.
- August 17–18, 1987: Typhoon Cary (Ising) impacted northern Luzon with rainfall and several landslides. Nationwide, 954 homes were damaged and an additional 89 were destroyed, which resulted in 55,567 people or 13,247 families that either sought shelter or were homeless.
- September 8–9, 1987: Typhoon Gerald (Neneng) affected the Babuyan Group of Islands, with its outer rain bands bringing torrential rainfall over much of Luzon.
- October 24, 1987: Typhoon Lynn (Pepang) traversed the northern coast of Luzon, with most impacts being experienced in the Cagayan and Ilocos regions. Some landslides were experienced in Benguet.
- November 14–15, 1987: Tropical Depression Rosing affected Visayas after passing the archipelago.
- November 25, 1987: Typhoon Nina (Sisang) severely impacted the Bicol Region as a Category 5 super typhoon. A total of 90,173 homes were demolished due to Nina while an additional 109,633 were partially destroyed. Overall, damages from the storm totalled $54.5 million and 912 people perished.
- December 15–16, 1987: Typhoon Phyllis (Trining) impacted Visayas as a Category 3 typhoon. Only 13 people died from the typhoon.

=== 1988 ===
- January 16, 1988: Typhoon Roy (Asiang) struck the Bicol Region as a Category 1 typhoon and passed through Metro Manila. Low-lying areas in the storm's path were flooded by heavy rains and strong winds downed power lines in Sorsogon.
- May 30 – June 1, 1988: Typhoon Susan (Biring) brought rainfall over Luzon, which resulted in landslides around Manila, killing 6 people.
- June 27, 1988: Tropical Storm Vanessa (Edeng) affected Visayas and Mindanao with rainfall.
- July 18, 1988: Typhoon Warren (Huaning) made landfall over the extreme northeastern tip of Luzon as a strong typhoon, prompting flooding that resulted in the suspension of classes.
- September 19–20, 1988: Tropical Storm Kit (Maring) brushed the northeastern portion of Luzon.
- October 20–21, 1988: Tropical Storm Pat (Toyang) passed through the central portion of Luzon.
- October 23–24, 1988: Typhoon Ruby (Unsang) struck the country as a moderately strong typhoon. At the time, it was the strongest typhoon to strike the Philippines in 18 years. At least 110,000 people were left homeless, while nearly 3 million people were affected.
- November 2–3, 1988: Tropical Storm Tess (Welpring) affected Visayas, but mostly impacted Palawan. Flash flooding occurred over Calabarzon, Central Visayas and Western Visayas.
- November 6–8, 1988: Typhoon Skip (Yoning) impacted Visayas. In all, 237 people died from the typhoon.
- December 22–23, 1988: Tropical Storm Val (Apiang) neared the eastern seaboards of the country, bringing light to moderate rainfall.

=== 1989 ===
- January 27–28, 1989: An unnamed tropical depression brought heavy flooding as high as 1.2 m (4 ft) over much of Samar Island. Flooding killed 61 people, with agricultural losses estimated at $5 million.
- May 16–17, 1989: Tropical Storm Brenda (Bining) affected much of Visayas and Luzon with strong winds, resulting in the downing of many trees and power lines. Flooding triggered by the storm prompted officials to evacuate over 5,700 people.
- June 6–7, 1989: Tropical Storm Dot (Kuring) produced widespread rainfall over the country, which resulted in several landslides.
- July 8, 1989: Tropical Storm Faye (Elang) struck Northern Luzon.
- July 16, 1989: Typhoon Gordon (Goring) made landfall over Cagayan, packing sustained winds estimated at 260 km/h (160 mph). 90 people died from the typhoon.
- September 9–10, 1989: Typhoon Sarah (Openg) brought several days of rainfall over Luzon. Two tornadoes were reported in Central Luzon. Roughly 200,000 people remained homeless.
- October 5, 1989: Typhoon Angela (Rubing) made landfall over the extreme northern tip of Luzon as a Category 4 super typhoon. It is estimated that 119 people perished, and 192 more were injured.
- October 10, 1989: Typhoon Dan (Saling) crossed over much of Southern Luzon. The storm triggered flooding and landslides, while high winds, estimated up to 160 km/h (99 mph) brought down trees and powerlines.
- October 18–19, 1989: Typhoon Elsie (Tasing) battered Luzon as one of the most intense typhoons to hit the country. Only 47 people died from the typhoon.
- November 21–22, 1989: Typhoon Hunt (Unsing) traversed Central Luzon. 11 people died from the typhoon, and about 1,500 people were left homeless.

== 1990s ==
=== 1990 ===
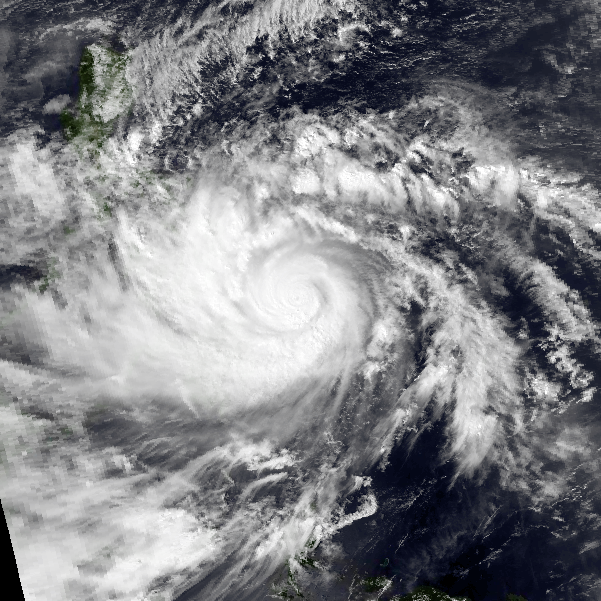
Typhoon Ruping (Mike) nearing landfall in the Philippines on November 12, 1990

- June 20–22, 1990: Typhoon Ofelia (Bising) moved off the northeastern coastline of the country, with its outflow and rain bands bringing heavy rainfall. In all, 56 people were killed.
- June 25–26, 1990: Typhoon Percy (Klaring) battered Northern Luzon as a strong typhoon. Fortunately, damages remained little.
- August 17–18, 1990: Typhoon Yancy (Gading) triggered a monsoon surge by the storm, which resulted in significant rainfall which flooded areas in northern Luzon. A minimum of six people were killed, and over 60,000 people fled to evacuation centers.
- August 26, 1990: Typhoon Becky (Heling) moved through extreme portion of northern Luzon, bringing heavy flooding, killing 32 people.
- August 28–30, 1990: Typhoon Abe (Iliang) made landfall in Zhejiang, China and its outflow made landslides killing 94 people.
- September 7, 1990: Typhoon Dot (Loleng) mainly affected the Babuyan Group of Islands. However the typhoon pulled the southwest monsoon which brought rainfall over much of Luzon, killing 4 people.
- September 15, 1990: Typhoon Ed (Miding), like previous storms, brushed the northern coast of Luzon.
- November 12–13, 1990: Typhoon Mike (Ruping) slammed Luzon and Visayas as a severe typhoon. At the time, it was the strongest typhoon to hit the country after 9 years. Over 700 people died from the typhoon.

=== 1991 ===
- March 12–13, 1991: Tropical Storm Sharon (Auring) impacted Caraga and most of Visayas as a weakening system.
- April 24–25, 1991: Tropical Depression Bebeng passed over Mindanao and some islands of Visayas.
- June 14–15, 1991: Typhoon Yunya (Diding) struck the Philippines during the colossal eruption of Mount Pinatubo of 1991. Although the storm itself caused significant damage, the worst effects were related to the system's heavy rains mixing with volcanic ash from Mount Pinatubo, creating massive lahars that killed 320 people.
- July 9–10, 1991: Tropical Depression Etang moved through the Bicol Region and much of Southern Luzon.
- July 18, 1991: The passage of Typhoon Amy (Gening) in the Babuyan Group of Islands caused heavy rainfall throughout most of Luzon. Volcanic debris from Mount Pinatubo's slopes loosened by heavy rain destroyed approximately 500 houses throughout the country.
- July 22, 1991: Tropical Storm Brendan (Helming) passed over northeastern Luzon, causing rainfall, landslides and mudflows.
- October 27–28, 1991: Typhoon Ruth (Trining) impacted the extreme Northern Luzon, killing 82 people.
- November 4–5, 1991: Tropical Storm Thelma (Uring) passed over Eastern Visayas and Central Visayas. It was one of the deadliest tropical cyclones in Philippine history, killing at least 5,081 people.
- November 13, 1991: Tropical Storm Seth (Warling) affected the northern coastline of Luzon.
- November 16–17, 1991: Tropical Storm Wilda (Yayang) traversed the Bicol Region and Southern Luzon.

=== 1992 ===
- July 10, 1992: Typhoon Eli (Konsing) traversed Central Luzon as a Category 1 typhoon. Only four people were killed. Offshore, 10 ships sunk. Moreover, torrential rains associated with the typhoon alleviated drought conditions.
- July 20, 1992: Tropical Depression Ditang briefly passed Luzon. Light to moderate rainfall was associated from the storm.
- September 21, 1992: Tropical Storm Ted (Maring) stalled and re-curved off the northern coast of Luzon, only affecting Batanes and nearby islands with rainfall.
- October 21–22, 1992: Tropical Storm Colleen (Paring) traversed Central Luzon, bringing heavy rainfall and flooding.

=== 1993 ===
- February 28 – March 1, 1993: Tropical Depression Atring made landfall over eastern Mindanao. Heavy rainfall was experienced for most of the southern half of the country.
- April 12, 1993: Tropical Depression Bining affected Mindanao with light rainfall.
- June 19, 1993: Tropical Depression Elang traversed Southern Luzon.
- June 25–26, 1993: Typhoon Koryn (Goring) battered Northern Luzon. The typhoon caused landslides that left around 30 people dead, injuring 109 others and left $14 million (1993 USD) in damage. The Philippine government declared 16 provinces disaster areas after the storm.
- July 8, 1993: Tropical Storm Lewis (Huling) affected Southern Luzon, Bicol Region and Eastern Visayas.
- August 18–19, 1993: Tropical Storm Tasha (Rubing) moved over the northern islands of the country, with its outflow bringing heavy rainfall throughout most of the country.
- August 23, 1993: Tropical Storm Winona (Saling) passed through Visayas.
- September 15, 1993: Tropical Storm Becky (Yeyeng) moved off the northern coast of the country.
- October 3–4, 1993: Typhoon Flo (Kadiang) brought heavy flooding over Luzon, resulting in 430 deaths.
- October 31 – November 1, 1993: Typhoon Ira (Husing) impacted Central Luzon as a strong typhoon.
- November 21, 1993: Tropical Storm Kyle (Luring) passed through Visayas.
- December 5, 1993: Typhoon Lola (Monang) impacted much of Southern Luzon with heavy rainfall. Flash flooding and landslides killed about 230 people.
- December 9–10, 1993: Typhoon Manny (Naning) impacted much of Visayas and Southern Luzon as a strong typhoon.
- December 15, 1993: Tropical Depression Oning brought light rainfall over Eastern Visayas and Central Visayas.
- December 25–26, 1993: Tropical Storm Nell (Puring) affected both Visayas and Mindanao.

=== 1994 ===
- January 5, 1994: Tropical Depression Akang made landfall over Eastern Samar. Around 40 deaths were reported due to the storm, with damages of about Php70 million (US$2.4 million) in damage reported.
- April 3–5, 1994: Tropical Storm Owen (Bising) made landfall between Leyte and Mindanao. The impact from the storm caused a state of calamity to be declared in nine provinces.
- May 24, 1994: Tropical Depression Deling traversed Visayas, bringing moderate to heavy rainfall. Heavy flooding killed five people and left one person missing.
- June 22, 1994: Tropical Depression Gading moved over much of Southern Luzon, where mudflows were seen over Mount Pinatubo.
- July 9–10, 1994: The combined impacts of Typhoon Tim (Iliang) and Tropical Storm Vanessa (Loleng) caused widespread heavy rainfall over much of Luzon and Western Visayas.
- July 18, 1994: Tropical Storm Yunya (Norming) moved over the northern coast of Luzon. Gusts were in excess of 60 knots (110 km/h) across Luzon.
- September 10–11, 1994: Tropical Storm Luke (Weling) moved over the extreme northern coastline of Luzon.
- October 21, 1994: Typhoon Teresa (Katring) impacted much of the lower half of Luzon, with most impacts located over the Calabarzon region.
- December 21–22, 1994: Typhoon Axel (Garding) impacted the Visayas archipelago. 19 people perished from the typhoon.

=== 1995 ===
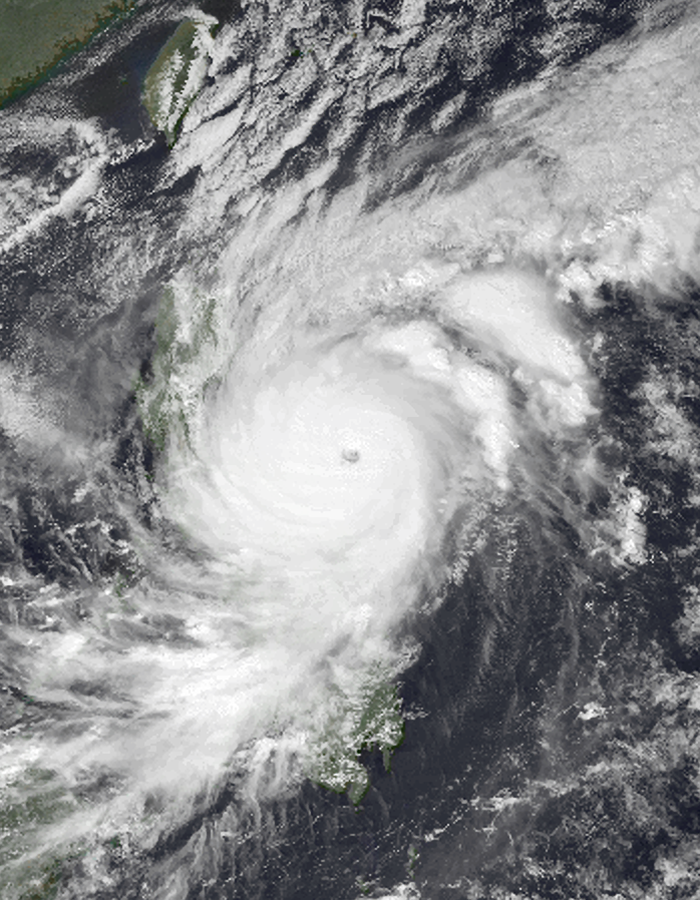
Typhoon Rosing (Angela) nearing the Philippines on November 2, 1995

- June 1–2, 1995: Tropical Storm Deanna (Auring) affected Visayas and the western provinces of Luzon.
- July 28, 1995: Tropical Depression 06W affected the eastern portion of Luzon such as the provinces of Cagayan and Isabela. PAGASA never tracked the storm.
- August 9, 1995: Tropical Storm Helen (Karing) passed close to the coast of extreme Northern Luzon.
- August 29, 1995: Typhoon Kent (Gening) brushed the Philippine island of Basco in Batanes. Five people died in Luzon and over 178,000 people were affected by flash flooding. The heavy rainfall also caused mudslides that flowed down the sides of Mount Pinatubo that buried small villages.
- September 4–5, 1995: Tropical Storm Nina (Helming) affected and passed over Northern Luzon as a minimal storm.
- September 22, 1995: Typhoon Ryan (Luding) briefly passed over the Babuyan Group of Islands.
- September 29–30, 1995: Tropical Storm Sibyl (Mameng) affected Eastern Visayas, Metro Manila and much of Luzon. As a result, from the storm's effect, 108 people died and it caused US$38.5 million in damages.
- October 23–24, 1995: Tropical Storm Yvette (Oniang) traversed Southern Luzon with light to moderate rainfall.
- October 29, 1995: Typhoon Zack (Pepang) crossed over much of Visayas, with 110 deaths in Visayas and 27 dead in Vietnam.
- November 2–3, 1995: Typhoon Angela (Rosing) impacted the Bicol Region, much of Southern Luzon and Metro Manila as a Category 5 super typhoon. It was the strongest to hit the country in 25 years at the time. 882 people were found dead, and damages toppled up Php9.33 billion (US$315 million).
- December 4–5, 1995: Tropical Depression Sendang brought heavy rainfall over much of the Bicol Region, killing 14 people.

=== 1996 ===
- March 1, 1996: Tropical Depression Asiang affected Central Visayas and Northern Mindanao with light to moderate rainfall.
- April 7–8, 1996: Tropical Storm Ann (Biring) traversed much of Visayas with rainfall and landslides. Casualties and damages remain unknown.
- May 23, 1996: Tropical Storm Cam (Ditang) passed through the Babuyan Group of Islands.
- July 24, 1996: Typhoon Gloria (Gloring) brushed the northern coast of the Philippines without making landfall. 20 people were dead from the typhoon.
- August 19–20, 1996: Tropical Storm Niki (Lusing) made landfall over Cagayan Valley. Heavy rainfall occurred over much of Northern Luzon.
- September 7, 1996: Typhoon Sally (Maring), as a Category 5 super typhoon, passed the coast of extreme Northern Luzon. Flash flooding and strong winds were reported, and casualties were estimated at 140.
- October 11, 1996: Tropical Depression Reming passed Luzon, killing 8 people and leaving 7 people missing. Damages were up to only US$4.3 million.
- October 18, 1996: Tropical Storm Beth (Seniang) impacted the northeastern portion of Cagayan. One person drowned in the province of Ifugao.
- November 6–8, 1996: Tropical Storm Ernie (Toyang) brought heavy rainfall throughout most of the country. The storm, killed 24 people, left 12 others missing and caused US$5.1 million in damages.

=== 1997 ===
- May 26, 1997: Tropical Depression Bining affected most of Luzon bringing heavy to torrential rainfall.
- August 27–28, 1997: Typhoon Amber (Miling) affected Cagayan and Batanes with rainfall and gusty winds.
- October 20, 1997: Typhoon Ivan (Narsing) made landfall over Northern Luzon, producing torrential rains that triggered waist-deep floods. 14 people were killed by the typhoon.
- October 29–31, 1997: The precursor low-pressure area which would become Tropical Depression Openg traversed Visayas, producing heavy rainfall that killed two people.
- November 15–16, 1997: Tropical Storm Mort (Pining) brought locally heavy rainfall to areas of northern Luzon, resulting in minor flooding.

=== 1998 ===
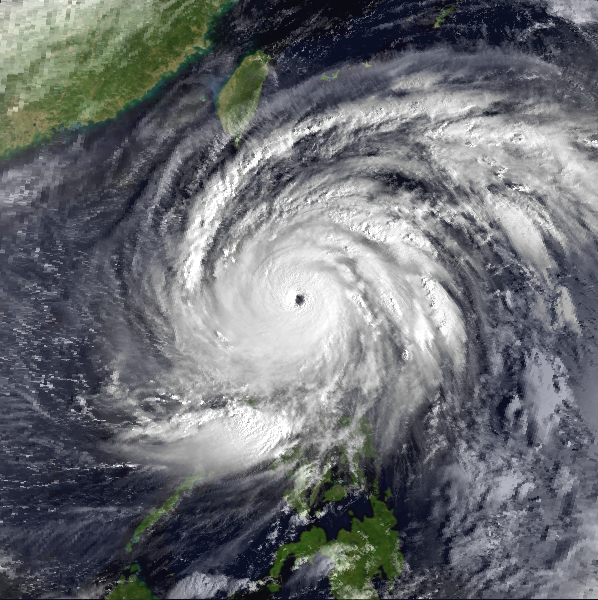
Typhoon Zeb (Iliang) making landfall on Luzon on October 13, 1998

- August 3, 1998: Typhoon Otto (Bising) affected Batanes and the Babuyan Group of Islands, dumping heavy rainfall across Northern Luzon.
- August 7–8, 1998: Tropical Storm Penny (Klaring) made landfall in Cagayan.
- September 18–19, 1998: Typhoon Vicki (Gading) made landfall over in the Ilocos Region. The storm was known to sink the ferry MV Princess of the Orient during the onslaught of the typhoon, killing 70 and leaving 80 others missing and presumed dead.
- October 13–14, 1998: Typhoon Zeb (Iliang) struck the Cagayan Province as a Category 5 super typhoon. The typhoon dropped torrential rainfall in Luzon, reaching 1,116 millimetres (43.9 inches) in one day in La Trinidad, estimated as a one-in-1,147-year event. 83 people died from the typhoon due to flooding, landslides or gusty winds.
- October 21–23, 1998: Typhoon Babs (Loleng) moved offshore as a Category 4 super typhoon, with the most impacts in Cagayan and the Bicol Region. 303 people died from the typhoon while 751 were injured.
- December 10–11, 1998: Typhoon Faith (Norming) traversed Visayas as a weak typhoon. The PAGASA issued a Tropical Cyclone Warning Signal No. 3 over in Eastern Samar and Central Visayas. 33 people died from the typhoon.
- December 17–18, 1998: An unnamed tropical depression developed to the north of Central Visayas and traversed northward, affecting much of Southern Luzon with heavy rainfall.

=== 1999 ===
- April 9, 1999: Tropical Depression Karing made landfall over the Bicol Region. The rainfall from the system ranged from 80 mm (3 inches) up to 400 mm (16 inches) in some places in the Philippines, but only minor damage was recorded on land.
- April 22, 1999: Tropical Storm Kate (Diding) persisted in the eastern coast of Eastern Samar. The system brought torrential rain to the eastern and central portion of the Philippines, with amounts as high as 360 mm (14 in) falling in places.
- June 4–5, 1999: The outflow of Typhoon Maggie (Etang) brought heavy rainfall across Luzon and the upper portion of Visayas.
- August 18–19, 1999: Tropical Storm Sam (Luding) impacted the northern portion of Luzon. Landslides occurred the most in Baguio.
- September 1–3, 1999: Tropical Storm Wendy (Mameng) brought rainfall across Luzon.
- September 10–11, 1999: Tropical Depression Neneng brought heavy showers of up to 400 mm (16 inches), which caused some flooding in the Cagayan Valley, where 18 people died.
- October 6, 1999: Typhoon Dan (Pepang) battered the extreme northern Luzon as a Category 3 typhoon, which brought torrential rainfall and rough waves.
- November 8–9, 1999: Tropical Depression Frankie (Sendang) brought heavy rain of up to 300 mm (12 inches) over Visayas.

== Climatology ==
Storms Affecting the Philippines by month (1963-1999)
Month	Number of Storms
January	3
February	1
March	2
April	6
May	4
June	15
July	20
August	16
September	20
October	29
November	19
December	13

== Deadly storms ==
The following list are the deadliest storms that impacted the Philippines between 1963 and 1999. This list only includes typhoons that had death tolls exceeding 300. Only two storms exceeded death numbers above 1,000: Thelma (Uring) and Ike (Nitang). The total number of deaths recorded are only from the country itself.

Rank	Name	Year	Number of Deaths
1	Thelma (Uring)	1991	5,081
2	Ike (Nitang)	1984	1,426
3	Nina (Sisang)	1987	979
4	Angela (Rosing)	1995	936
5	Agnes (Undang)	1984	895
6	Joan (Sening)	1970	768
7	Mike (Ruping)	1990	748
8	Kate (Titang)	1970	631
9	Irma (Anding)	1981	585
10	Louise (Ining)	1964	≥577
11	Flo (Kadiang)	1993	576
12	Olga (Didang)	1976	374
13	Babs (Loleng)	1998	303
14T	Emma (Welming)	1967	300
14T	Rita (Kading)	1978	≥300

== See also ==
- List of typhoons in the Philippines (2000–present)
- List of typhoons in the Philippines (1900–1929)
- Typhoons in the Philippines
