= List of Philippine typhoons (1900–1929) =

The Philippines is an archipelagic country located in Southeast Asia, beside the northwest Pacific Ocean. The nation consists of 7,641 islands. The country is known to be "the most exposed country in the world to tropical storms", with about twenty tropical cyclones entering the Philippine area of responsibility each year. In the Filipino, (Note: With some local languages.) tropical cyclones are generally called bagyo.

Climatologically, in the Northwest Pacific basin, most tropical cyclones develop between May and October. However, the Philippines can experience a tropical cyclone anytime in the year, with the most storms during the months of June to September. This article includes any tropical cyclone of any intensity that affected the Philippines between 1900 and 1929.

== Systems ==
=== 1900s ===
==== 1900 ====
- August 17, 1900 - A typhoon wrecked the province of Albay, wrecking a ship. The typhoon had no recorded fatalities.
- September 23, 1900 - A typhoon crossed the Visayas archipelago, the typhoon caused 1,600 fatalities and destroyed multiple buildings and farms.
- September 29, 1900 - A typhoon crossed the Philippines, later dissipating in Vietnam.
- October 5, 1900 - A typhoon affected the Samar Island, dissipating in Vietnam.
- October 30, 1900 - A typhoon moved westward across the Philippines, again dissipating in Vietnam.
- November 4, 1900 - A typhoon, named the Hong Kong typhoon, moved westward across the Philippines.

==== 1901 ====
- May 14, 1901 - A typhoon moved westward across the Philippines, curving westward and later striking Taiwan.
- July 12, 1901 - A typhoon formed east of Luzon, later moving through Cagayan and Ilocos.
- September 8, 1901 - A storm formed east of the Visayas archipelago.
- September 30, 1901 - A storm formed east of Luzon, crossing Nueva Ecija and Pangasinan, later curving north affecting Batanes.

==== 1902 ====
- January 1, 1902 - A depression crossed Mindanao, affecting four ships.
- January 4, 1902 - A typhoon crossed Leyte, approaching Cebu then recurved to Masbate and dissipated in Northern Samar.
- January 8, 1902 - A depression crossed Mindanao, being responsible for heavy rains over the region.
- January 12, 1902 - A depression crossed Surigao and crossed the Jolo Sea.
- January 18, 1902 - A depression went to Mindanao and went to the Jolo Sea.
- May 18, 1902 - A depression curved around Luzon and went to Japan.
- May 27, 1902 - A typhoon crossed Luzon and ended up in the South China Sea, passing Vigan.
- June 20, 1902 - A depression approached the Philippines, then moved towards the Balintang Channel, then went to the Ryukyu Islands.
- July 6, 1902 - A depression went towards Northern Samar, then crossed Masbate and Mindoro, making its way to Hainan.

== See also ==
- List of typhoons in the Philippines (2000–present)
- List of typhoons in the Philippines (1963–1999)
- Typhoons in the Philippines
