= Typhoon Angela =

Pacific typhoon in 1995

Typhoon Angela (Rosing)
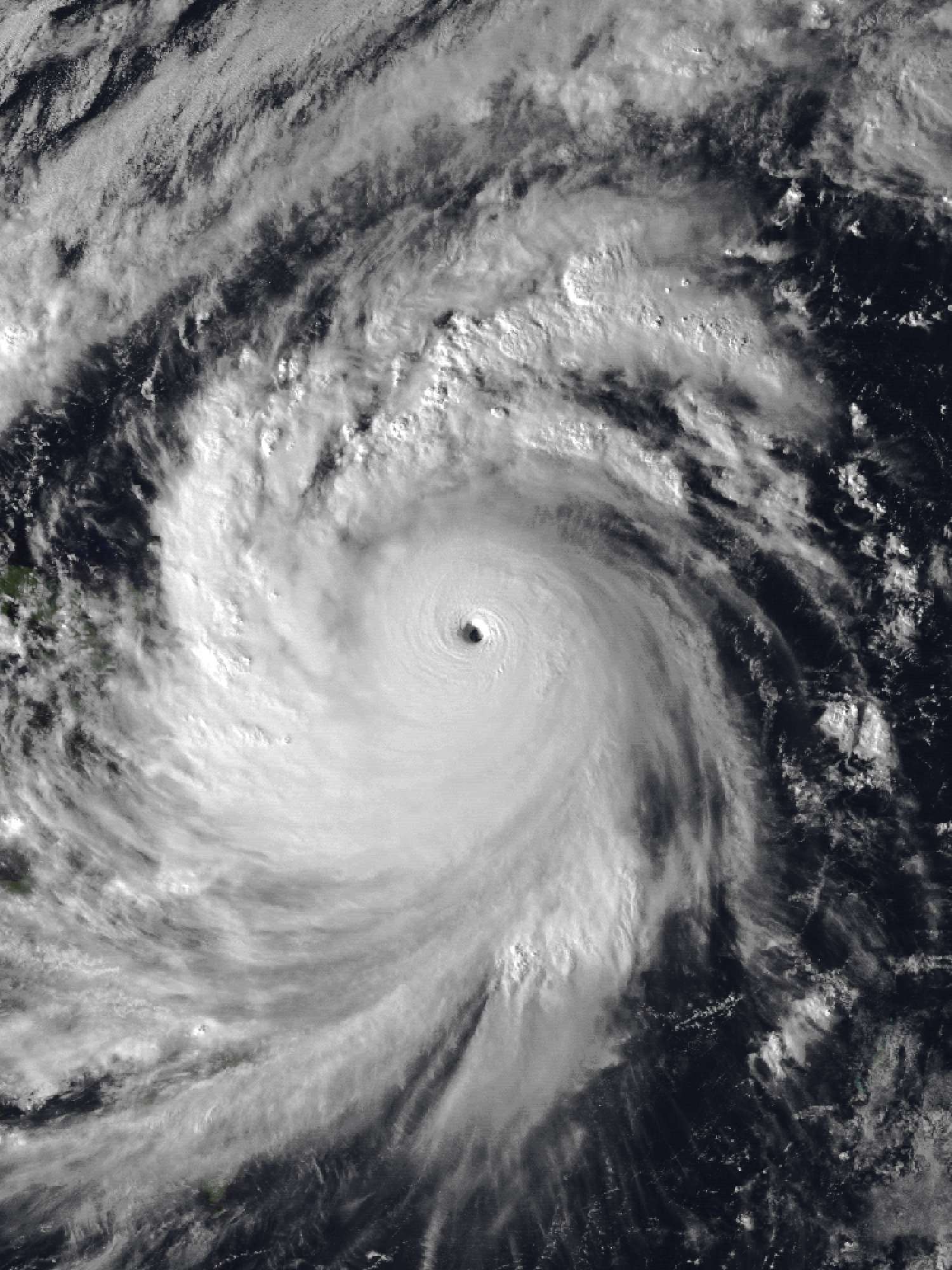
- Typhoon Angela approaching the Philippines near peak intensity on November 1

Meteorological history
- Formed: October 25, 1995
- Dissipated: November 7, 1995

Violent typhoon
- 10-minute sustained (JMA)
- Highest winds: 215 km/h (130 mph)
- Lowest pressure: 910 hPa (mbar); 26.87 inHg

Category 5-equivalent super typhoon
- 1-minute sustained (SSHWS/JTWC)
- Highest winds: 285 km/h (180 mph)
- Lowest pressure: 879 hPa (mbar); 25.96 inHg

Overall effects
- Fatalities: 936 total
- Damage: $315 million (1995 USD)
- Areas affected: Micronesia; Philippines; South China; Vietnam
- IBTrACS
- Part of the 1995 Pacific typhoon season

Typhoon Angela, named Rosing by PAGASA, was an extremely powerful and catastrophic tropical cyclone that impacted the Philippines in November 1995, and the most intense tropical cyclone worldwide in 1995. Typhoon Angela was the twenty-ninth tropical cyclone and fifth super typhoon of the 1995 Pacific typhoon season.

Angela caused PHP 9.33 billion worth of damage across the Philippines and 882 fatalities.

== Meteorological history ==
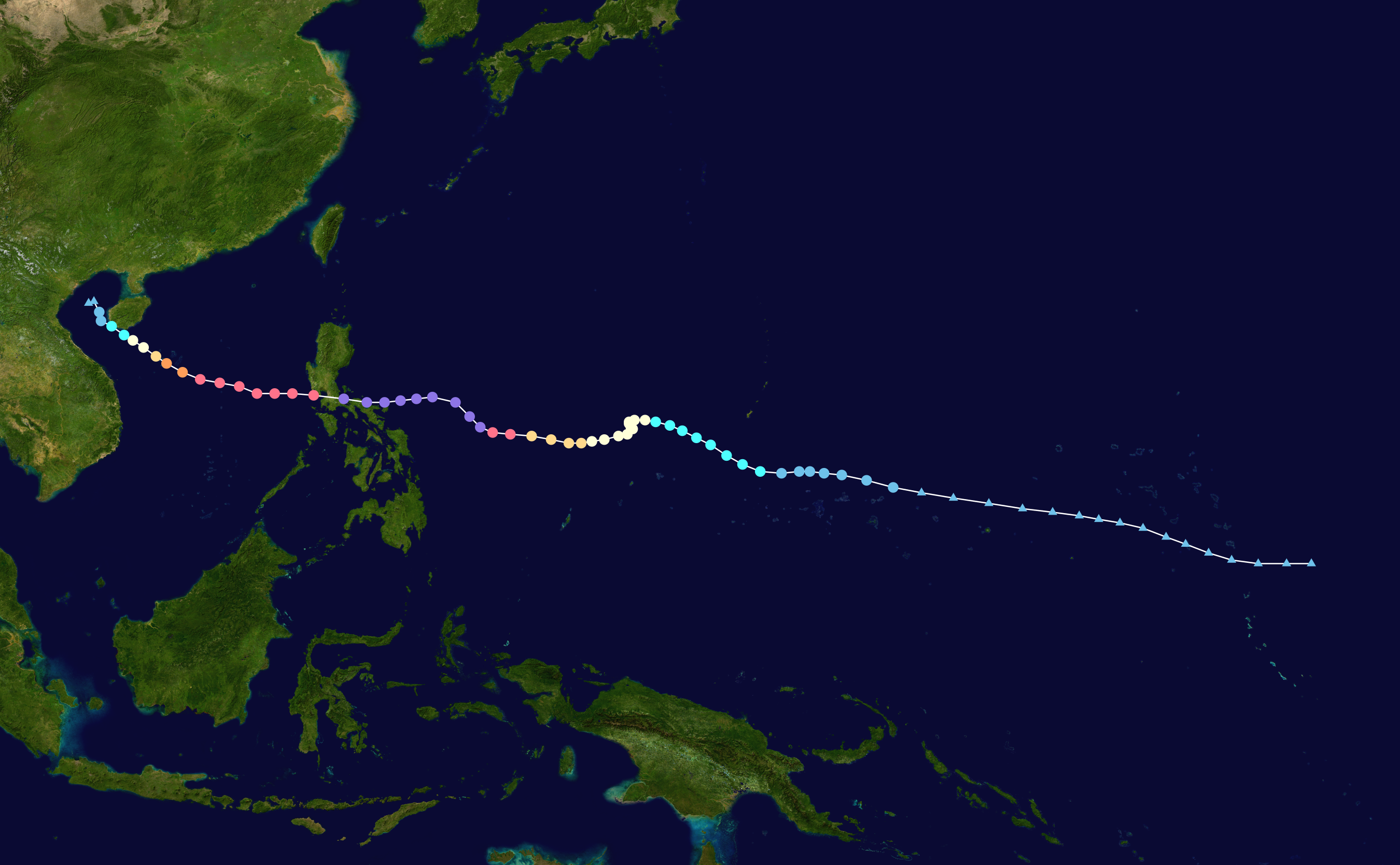
Map plotting the storm's track and intensity, according to the Saffir–Simpson scale Map key Saffir–Simpson scale Tropical depression (≤38 mph, ≤62 km/h) Tropical storm (39–73 mph, 63–118 km/h) Category 1 (74–95 mph, 119–153 km/h) Category 2 (96–110 mph, 154–177 km/h) Category 3 (111–129 mph, 178–208 km/h) Category 4 (130–156 mph, 209–251 km/h) Category 5 (≥157 mph, ≥252 km/h) Unknown Storm type Tropical cyclone Subtropical cyclone Extratropical cyclone, remnant low, tropical disturbance, or monsoon depression

The monsoon trough that developed Yvette and Zack spawned another tropical depression on October 25 in conjunction with a tropical disturbance that originated in the Marshall Islands. It moved to the west, organizing very slowly, becoming a tropical storm on October 26. Two days later, Angela further intensified into a typhoon, and between October 31 and November 1, Angela rapidly intensified into a Category 5-equivalent super typhoon with 1-minute sustained winds of 285 km/h (180 mph), while the Japan Meteorological Agency reported peak 10-minute sustained winds of 215 km/h (130 mph). It maintained that intensity before gradually weakening as it tracked westward, making landfall in the Philippines on November 2 with 1-minute sustained winds of 260 km/h (160 mph) –still at Category 5-equivalent intensity, becoming the strongest typhoon to hit the Philippines since Typhoon Joan in 1970. Angela continued to the west-northwest, where upper-level winds caused it to dissipate on November 7 over the Gulf of Tonkin.

Although the Japan Meteorological Agency, the official Regional Specialized Meteorological Centre of the western Pacific, estimated a minimum central pressure of 910 mbar (26.87 inHg), the JTWC unofficially estimated a central pressure of 879 mbar (25.96 inHg), which would rank it high on the list of most intense tropical cyclones, but still behind Typhoon Tip, the most intense tropical cyclone ever recorded. However, Angela is an unofficial contender for world's most intense tropical cyclone. In a study utilizing the Dvorak technique for analysis of post-1987 typhoons, the authors concluded that Angela and Typhoon Gay in 1992 were higher on the scale than Tip. The authors also thought that Angela might have been slightly more intense than Gay, and hence Tip.

== Effects ==
More than 900 people died due to the typhoon. It wreaked havoc over Metro Manila, Calabarzon and Bicol Region. It caused a total of 10.829 billion pesos in damage.

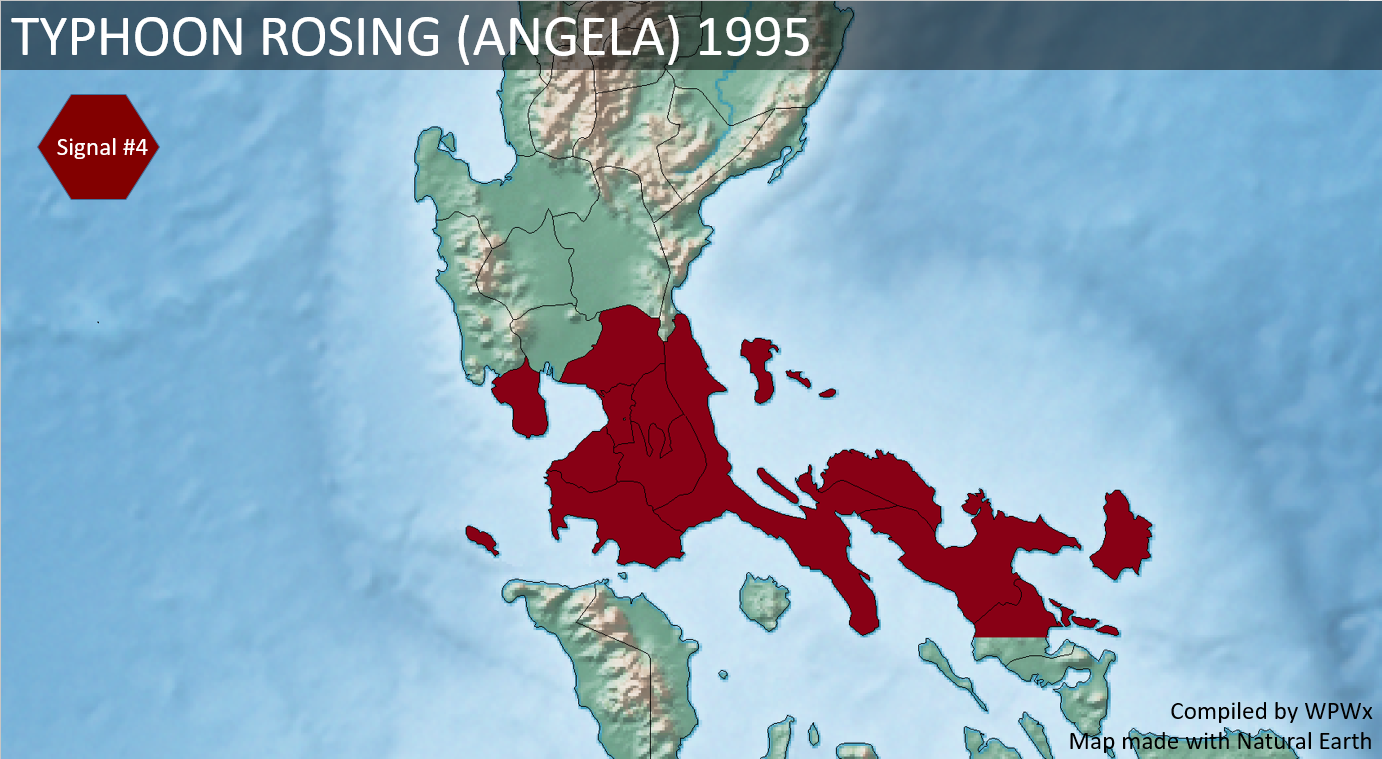
Provinces that were under PSWS Signal #4 during the passage of Typhoon Rosing (Angela)

More than 96,000 houses were destroyed throughout the affected area, along with bridges and roads. The worst impact was in the Bicol Region. Angela passed almost right over Metro Manila, causing a significant impact both there and in Catanduanes. In Calauag, storm surges and flooding from a dam failure killed 121 people. In nearby Paracale, mudslides killed more than a hundred people. Power outages affected one-third of the country. A weather observatory in Catanduanes reported a gust of 259 km/h (161 mph). This makes it the typhoon with third-highest gust recorded in the Philippines.

Due to the high death toll and catastrophic damages, PAGASA officially retired the name Rosing from the rotating naming lists. It was replaced by Rening, which was first used in the 1999 Pacific typhoon season.

== See also ==
- Tropical cyclones in 1995
- List of Philippine typhoons (1963–1999)
