= Typhoons Louise and Marge =

Pacific typhoon in 1964

Typhoon Louise (Ining) Tropical Storm Marge (Liling)
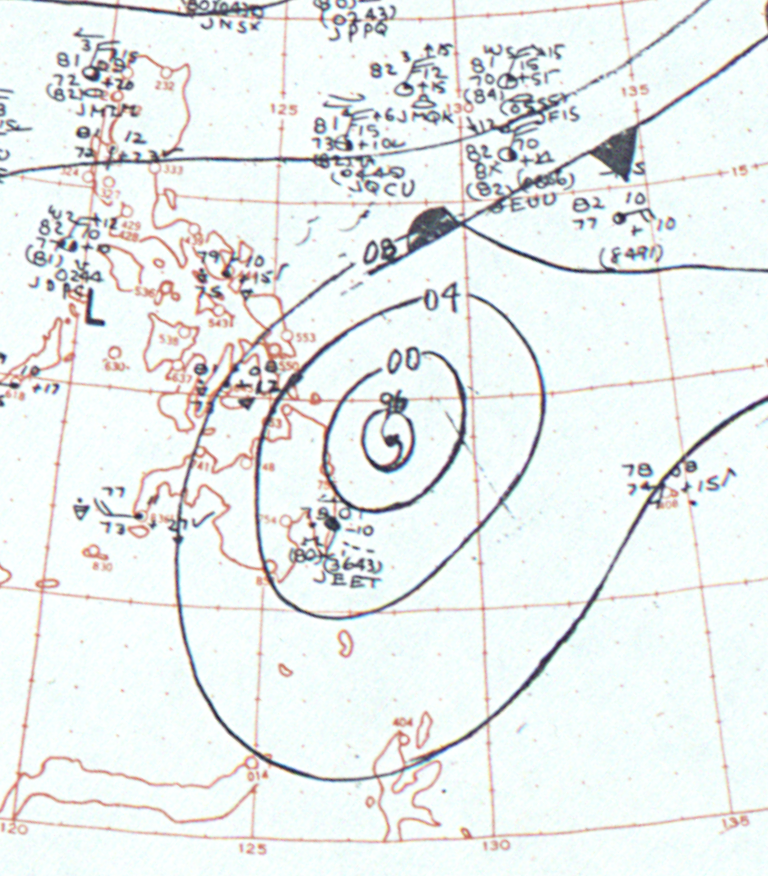
- Surface weather analysis of Typhoon Louise approaching the Philippines on November 18

Meteorological history
- as Typhoon Louise (Ining); Tropical Storm Marge (Liling)
- Formed: November 14, 1964
- Dissipated: November 21, 1964

Category 5-equivalent super typhoon
- 1-minute sustained (SSHWS/JTWC)
- Highest winds: 305 km/h (190 mph)
- Lowest pressure: 895 hPa (mbar); 26.43 inHg

Meteorological history
- as Tropical Storm Marge
- Formed: November 20, 1964
- Dissipated: November 26, 1964

Tropical storm
- 1-minute sustained (SSHWS/JTWC)
- Highest winds: 100 km/h (65 mph)
- Lowest pressure: 995 hPa (mbar); 29.38 inHg

Overall effects
- Fatalities: At least 577 (1 in Palau, ≥576 in the Philippines)
- Damage: ≥$12.6 million (1964 USD)
- Areas affected: Palau, Philippines
- IBTrACS
- Part of the 1964 Pacific typhoon season

Typhoon Louise and Tropical Storm Marge, known in the Philippines as Typhoon Ining and Tropical Storm Liling, respectively, were a pair of tropical cyclones that impacted Palau and the Philippines in November 1964. Louise was one of the most destructive typhoons documented in the central Philippines. Tracking data from meteorological agencies disagree whether the systems were a single tropical cyclone or two distinct tropical cyclones that occurred in quick succession, named separately by the Joint Typhoon Warning Center (JTWC) as Louise and Marge (and by the Philippine Weather Bureau as Ining and Liling).

The typhoon may have formed as early as November 14 in the vicinity of Yap State. It quickly strengthened and became a typhoon by November 16. Later that day, the storm passed south of Palau near Angaur. Intensification continued, and Louise's winds later reached Category 5 intensity on the Saffir–Simpson scale at 7.3°N, closer to the equator than any other storm of such strength in the Northern Hemisphere on record. The storm's one-minute sustained winds topped out at 305 km/h (190 mph) before making landfall on Surigao del Sur on November 18. Agencies that consider Louise and Marge to be the same storm indicate that the typhoon weakened over the Philippines and tracked northwest before making a counterclockwise arc across Luzon and the eastern South China Sea. Agencies that consider them separate systems believe Louise dissipated after crossing the Philippines, with a separate Marge concurrently developing east of Luzon and taking the arced path. Dissipation of Marge occurred by November 26.

Widespread devastation occurred in Angaur and Peleliu, two southern islands in Palau. In Peleliu, 97 percent of structures were destroyed. There was one death and four injuries caused by the typhoon in Palau, with total property and crop damage amounting to US$50,000–US$100,000. Louise moved across 13 Philippine provinces, with the most severe damage occurring in Surigao del Norte where the damage amounted to around US$12.5 million. Enumerations of the death toll ranged between 576 and 631, with around 300,000 people left homeless. Property damage was high throughout the affected regions, with Surigao City suffering the brunt of the typhoon. Philippine President Diosdado Macapagal stated that he had never "seen a more comprehensive devastation of any one province" following an aerial survey of Surigao del Norte.

== Meteorological history ==
=== Disagreements on classification ===
The classification of Typhoon Louise and Tropical Storm Marge as a single tropical cyclone or two distinct tropical cyclones is disputed among the datasets of meteorological agencies. The China Meteorological Administration (CMA) lists the system as a singular entity. However, the Japan Meteorological Agency (JMA) and Joint Typhoon Warning Center (JTWC)—of which the former manages the Regional Specialized Meteorological Center for the western Pacific—analyze the system as two tropical cyclones that occurred in quick succession. The JTWC named these two systems separately as Louise followed by Marge. The Philippine Weather Bureau also distinctly named the storms Ining and Liling.

=== Typhoon Louise ===
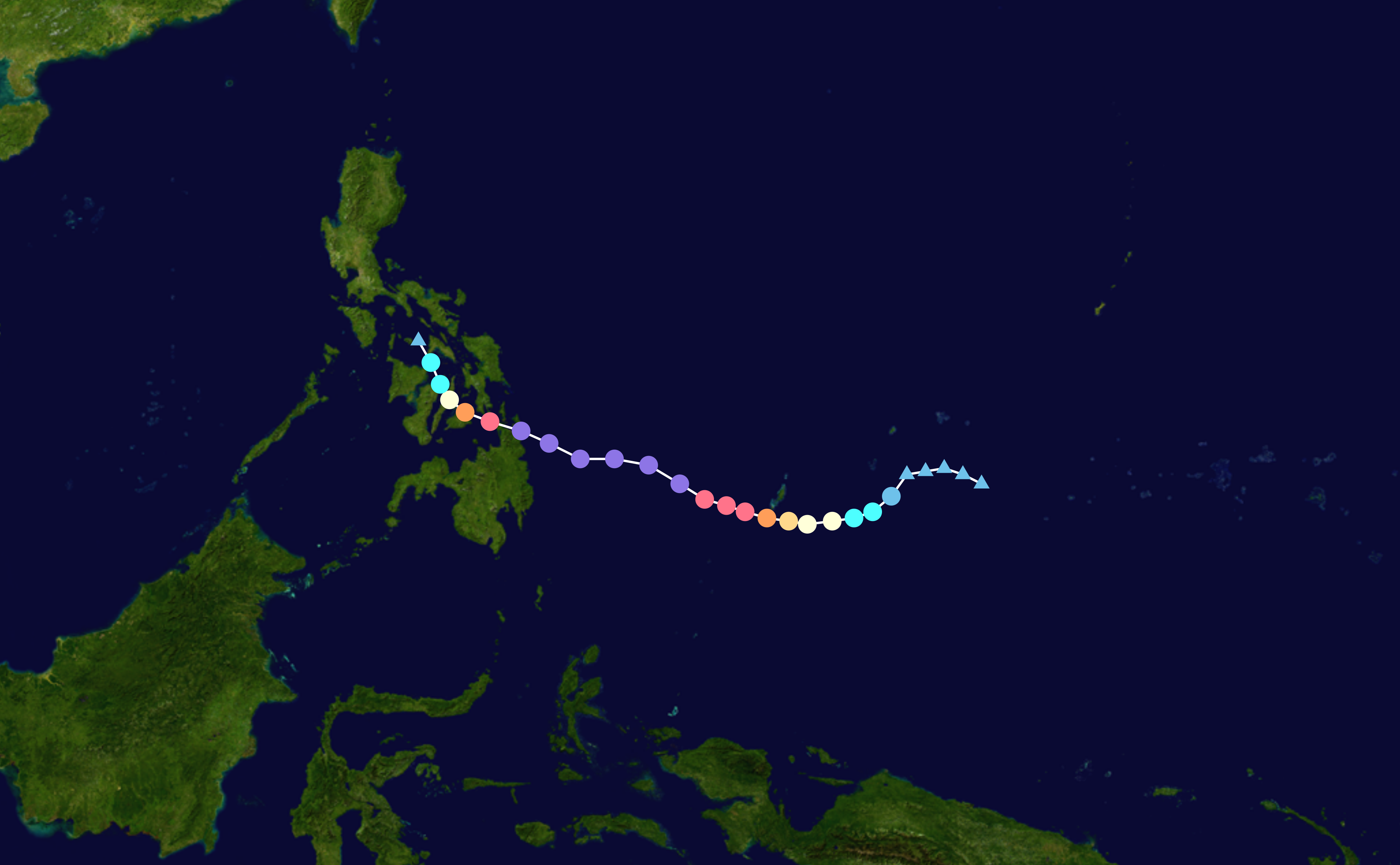
Track of Louise according to the Saffir–Simpson scale Map key Saffir–Simpson scale Tropical depression (≤38 mph, ≤62 km/h) Tropical storm (39–73 mph, 63–118 km/h) Category 1 (74–95 mph, 119–153 km/h) Category 2 (96–110 mph, 154–177 km/h) Category 3 (111–129 mph, 178–208 km/h) Category 4 (130–156 mph, 209–251 km/h) Category 5 (≥157 mph, ≥252 km/h) Unknown Storm type Tropical cyclone Subtropical cyclone Extratropical cyclone, remnant low, tropical disturbance, or monsoon depression

Louise originated from the interaction between a polar trough and a westward-moving tropical wave. A vortex spawned from this interaction by November 12, accompanied by low air pressures. The system was first detected using meteorological satellites, a venue for observation still in its infancy in the early 1960s. Data from the CMA suggest that the storm may have developed into a tropical cyclone as early as November 14, though the JMA and JTWC believed that the storm acquired such characteristics on November 15 while it was located approximately 160 km (99 mi) south of Yap State. The newly formed system developed quickly: reconnaissance aircraft began probing the developing storm late on November 15, finding one-minute maximum sustained winds of around 130 km/h (81 mph). This suggested Louise had potentially reached typhoon intensity within a day of forming. Tracking west-northwest, the typhoon passed 22 km (14 mi) south of Angaur on November 16, with its one-minute sustained winds reaching 185 km/h (115 mph) during the close passage according to the JTWC. Intensification continued, and Louise attained its peak intensity on November 18 with one-minute maximum sustained winds of 305 km/h (190 mph) according to the JTWC. The JMA estimated a minimum air pressure of 895 hPa (mbar; 27.02 inHg). This ranked Louise as one of the strongest typhoons in 1964. The typhoon was also located unusually close to the equator: at one point the storm had an intensity equivalent to a Category 5 hurricane on the Saffir–Simpson scale while located at 7.3°N, placing it closer to the equator than any other Northern Hemisphere tropical cyclone of such intensity.

On November 19, Louise made landfall on the shores of Lanzua Bay in Surigao del Sur, Philippines. At the time, the JTWC estimated that the storm had one-minute sustained winds of 260 km/h (160 mph). The typhoon then weakened as it crossed the Visayas and fell below typhoon intensity on November 20. The fate of the storm after this point is disputed. According to the JTWC, the once powerful typhoon, named solely Louise, crossed Panay and slowed until it was stationary near Masbate later on November 20, rapidly weakening into a tropical depression and later dissipating on November 21.

=== Tropical Storm Marge ===
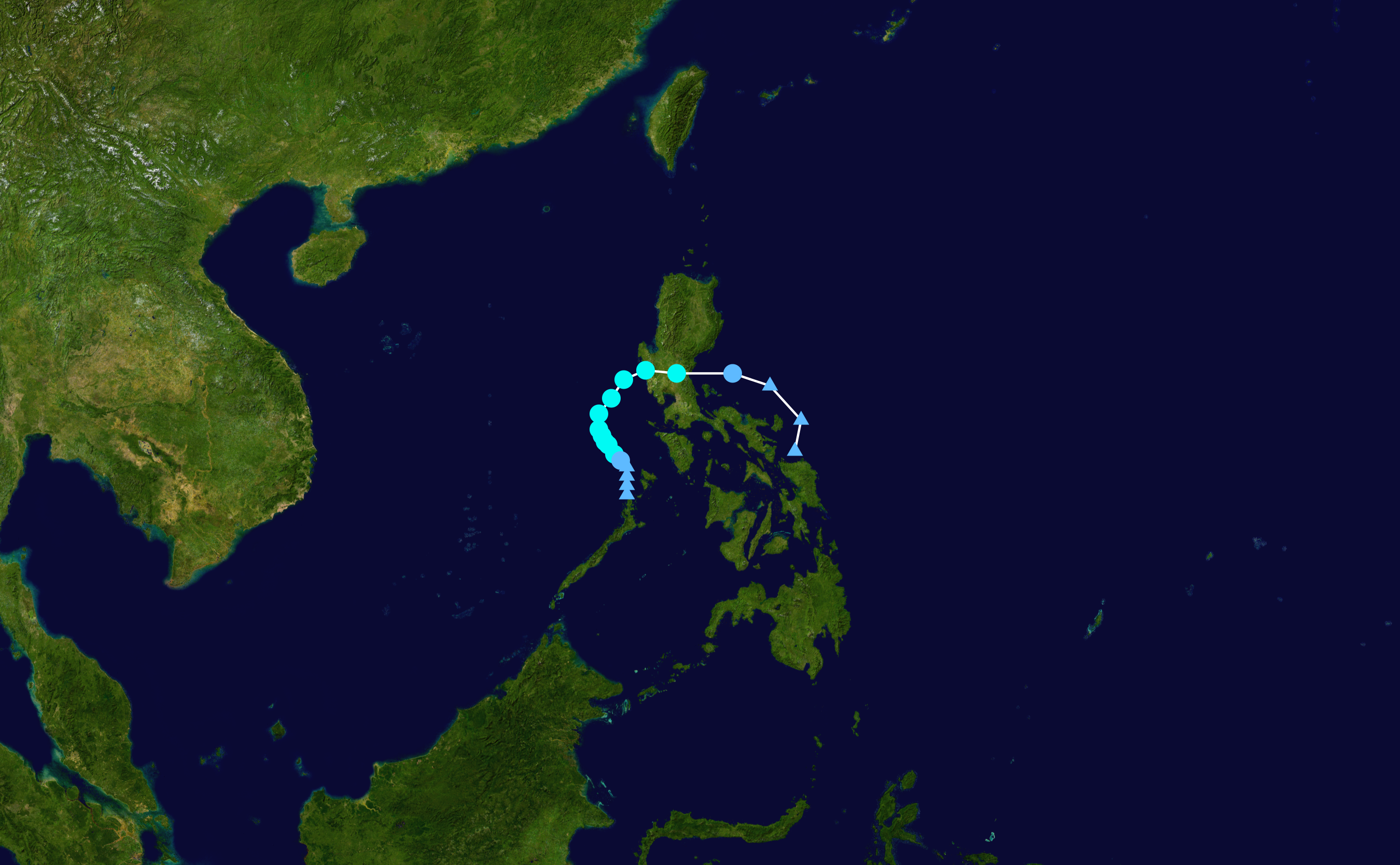
Track of Marge according to the Saffir–Simpson scale Map key Saffir–Simpson scale Tropical depression (≤38 mph, ≤62 km/h) Tropical storm (39–73 mph, 63–118 km/h) Category 1 (74–95 mph, 119–153 km/h) Category 2 (96–110 mph, 154–177 km/h) Category 3 (111–129 mph, 178–208 km/h) Category 4 (130–156 mph, 209–251 km/h) Category 5 (≥157 mph, ≥252 km/h) Unknown Storm type Tropical cyclone Subtropical cyclone Extratropical cyclone, remnant low, tropical disturbance, or monsoon depression

As Louise dissipated, the JTWC tracked a newly developing tropical cyclone, named Marge, that moved into Luzon at Dingalan as a low-end tropical storm. This system then emerged into the South China Sea, where it moved erratically over a small area and attained peak one-minute sustained winds of 100 km/h (62 mph) on November 22 before dissipating the next day. At the height of Marge's intensity, the storm possessed a large eye some 55–85 km (34–53 mi) in diameter. The JMA assessed Louise to have weakened after its encounter with the Philippines with dissipation in the South China Sea on November 21. The agency also monitored Tropical Storm Marge separately with a track beginning north of Samar on November 20 and taking an arced and clockwise path through Luzon and southwards within the South China Sea until the Marge's dissipation on November 26. The CMA depicts Marge indistinguishably from Louise, with the storm taking a continuous path northwest through the Visayas and then curving west across Luzon before turning south in the South China Sea. Data from the agencies indicate this second phase of the storm's duration dissipated on or before November 26.

== Impact and aftermath ==
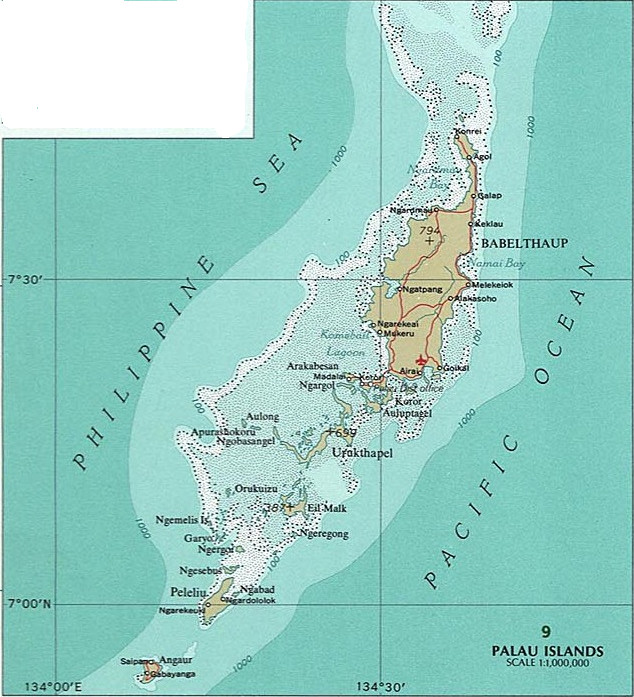
Map of Palau in 1970

The islands of Palau—administered at the time as part of the Trust Territory of the Pacific Islands—were affected by Louise between about 12:00 p.m. PWT on November 16 to 3:00 p.m. PWT November 17 (03:00 UTC November 16–06:00 UTC November 17). Angaur was within the storm's eye for 45 minutes. One-minute sustained winds were estimated at 185 km/h (115 mph) with gusts to 220 km/h (140 mph) as the typhoon passed. Thousands of people were rendered homeless by the typhoon in the islands. Louise's strong winds and storm surge destroyed much of the crops and vegetation on Angaur and Peleliu. Ninety percent of homes and much of the municipal and Trust government structures on Angaur were destroyed; a LORAN station operated by the United States Coast Guard and a church were among the few structures left standing. The damage was more pervasive on Peleliu where 97 percent of structures were destroyed. Total destruction or severe damage befell 15 percent of government facilities and 30 percent of private residences in Koror. The loss of homes displaced 53 families in Angaur and 125 families in Peleliu. One fatality and four injuries were reported in total from Palau, with property and crop damage ranging from US$50,000–US$500,000. Guam initiated relief efforts shortly after the typhoon's passage of Palau, leading to a joint effort between the Guam government, Commander Naval Forces Marianas, the American Red Cross, and the United States Coast Guard to deliver emergency supplies to the affected areas, including building materials, clothing, and vaccines. President Lyndon B. Johnson authorized $250,000 in federal funding for emergency assistance to Angaur and Peleliu on December 10. A rehabilitation committee was later established to plan the reconstruction of Angaur and Peleliu.

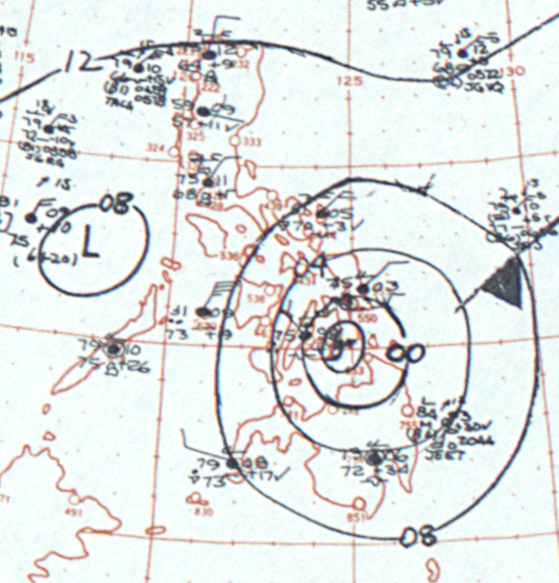
Surface weather analysis of the storm moving through the Philippines on November 19

In its summary of 1964 typhoons published in the annual Climatological Data report, the United States Weather Bureau wrote that Louise "was one of the most destructive storms to hit the central Philippines in years." The death toll reached at least 576 and was accompanied by numerous displaced, injured, or missing persons. Reuters reported that as many as 300,000 people were left homeless, while the Philippine government indicated that 286,870 people were left homeless and estimated that 157,000 families were affected by the storm. The Philippine Red Cross enumerated 631 fatalities, 69 injured, 157 missing, and 376,235 displaced persons. The typhoon wrought widespread damage, valued in the millions in Philippine pesos, to crops and public infrastructure. Communications were undermined in the typhoon. Louise traversed at least thirteen Philippine provinces. Winds as high as 260 km/h (160 mph) battered the provinces of Agusan, Bohol, Leyte, Surigao del Norte, and Negros Island. Surigao del Norte was hardest hit among them; at least 100 people were killed and an estimated 100,000 people were displaced by the storm in the province. These casualty figures were reported by a local police commander and later the Philippine Constabulary. At least 312 deaths occurred in Surigao, Surigao del Norte, where damage was estimated by Governor Constantino Navarro at around US$12.5 million; a village in the city reported over 100 fatalities and the loss of all buildings. Bacolod on Negros Island reported ten deaths and additional injuries. A tornado razed a chapel, killing the chapel minister and his family. A village leader in Negros Island gave of the following description of the destruction to a Philippine news service, as reported by The Canadian Press:

It was a pathetic sight as hysterical parents lost all their children. It was a nightmare. [...] Drowning victims shouting for help, others clinging to rooftops as their houses were carried away by rampaging floodwaters or smashed by logs ...

Floods and landslides damaged several bridges and public buildings in Agusan Province. Twelve drownings were reported in Occidental Mindoro. Nine inter-island ships capsized during the storm. Five people were killed after their ship sank off of Surigao del Norte. Another ship bearing 55 passengers sank off Zamboanga; the drownings of 6 people were confirmed while another 32 were presumed as drowned. Forty-six people were rescued after a freighter and a salvage tug were forced into a reef by the typhoon's winds off Labuan in Malaysia.

A state of calamity was declared for Surigao del Norte, accompanied by bans of hoarding and price speculation in the disaster zones. Colonel Godofredo Mendoza directed the deployment of all available Philippine Constabulary personnel in the province to assist in disaster relief. A government team was also mobilized to Surigao by President Diosdado Macapagal, as well as members of the Cabinet of the Philippines to survey the damage. Macapagal took part in an aerial survey of the damage in Surigao del Norte on November 25. Following the survey, Macapgal held an emergency meeting with the Cabinet and directed the issuance of loans to storm victims and to provide military and financial assistance to rebuilding the province; Macapgal commented that he had never "seen a more comprehensive devastation of any one province." Supplies and personnel were shipped to the disaster zone from Manila and other cities in the Philippines. The relief efforts of the Philippine Red Cross and Philippine Constabulary were directed not only to the typhoon's aftermath but to concurrent floods and an outbreak of cholera throughout the northern and central Philippines. The U.S. granted US$25,000 in relief aid to the Philippines. In June 1966, the Congress of the Philippines authorized ₱3.4 million to be distributed annually through fiscal year 1969-70 for Surigao del Norte and its municipalities.

== See also ==
- Typhoon Kate (1970)
- Typhoon Opal (1964)
- Typhoon Ike
- Typhoon Mike
- Typhoon Bopha - another typhoon that took a similar path and became the strongest typhoon to make landfall in the island of Mindanao.
- Typhoon Rai - the strongest typhoon to strike the Caraga Region since Louise, doing so as a Category 4 super typhoon.
