= Tropical Storm Tess =

Pacific severe tropical storm in 1988

Severe Tropical Storm Tess (Welpring)
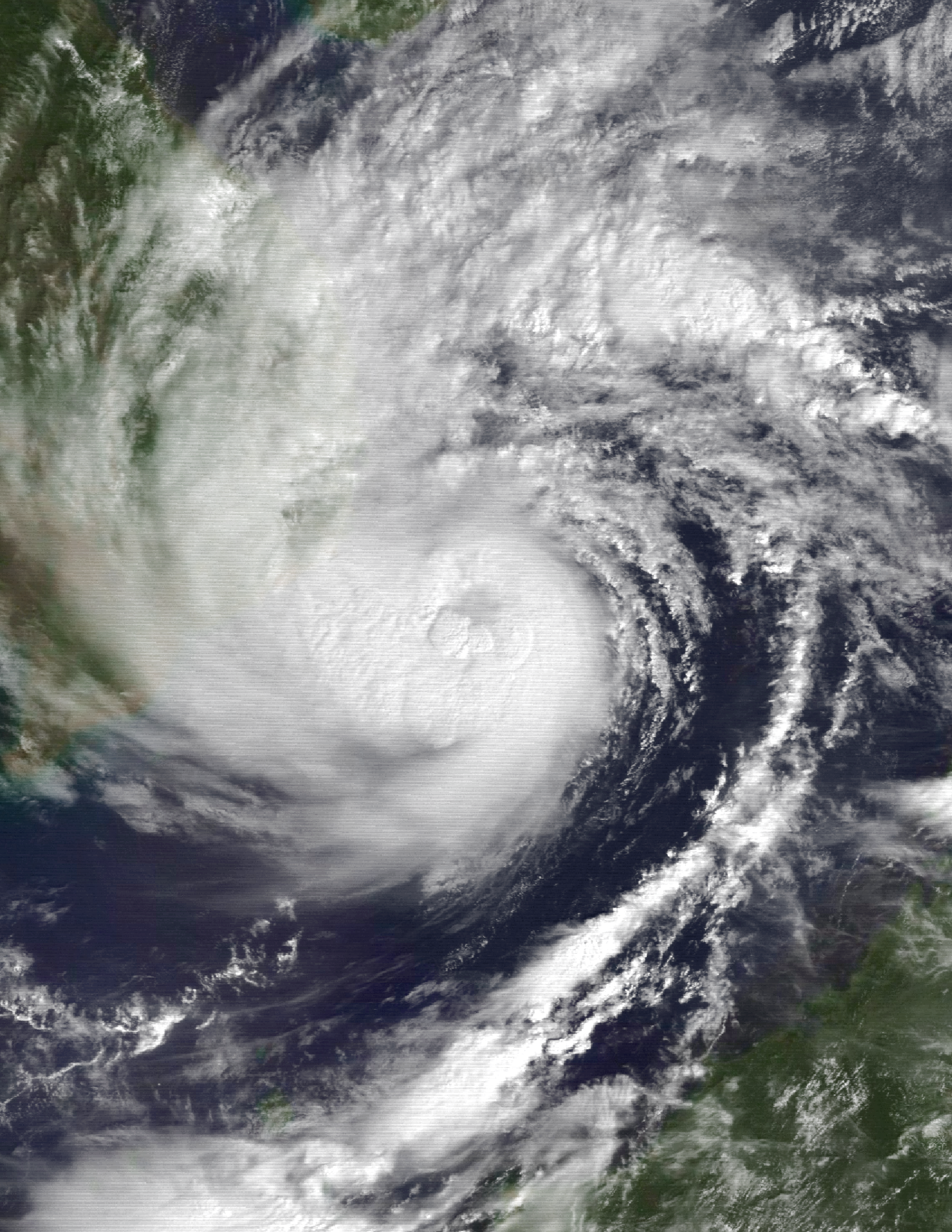
- Tess at peak intensity on November 6

Meteorological history
- Formed: November 1, 1988
- Dissipated: November 6, 1988

Severe tropical storm
- 10-minute sustained (JMA)
- Highest winds: 110 km/h (70 mph)
- Lowest pressure: 975 hPa (mbar); 28.79 inHg

Category 1-equivalent typhoon
- 1-minute sustained (SSHWS/JTWC)
- Highest winds: 120 km/h (75 mph)

Overall effects
- Fatalities: 141 total
- Damage: $22.4 million (1988 USD)
- Areas affected: Philippines, Vietnam
- Part of the 1988 Pacific typhoon season

Severe Tropical Storm Tess known in the Philippines as Tropical Storm Welpring was the second of three tropical cyclones to directly impact the Philippines in a two-week time frame in 1988. An area of disturbed weather near the Philippines was first observed on November 1. Following an increase in organization, the disturbance was designated as a tropical cyclone on November 4. Moving west, Tess steadily strengthened due to favorable conditions aloft. During the evening of November 5, Tess was estimated to have achieved its highest intensity, with winds of 115 km/h (70 mph). Rapid weakening then ensured as Tess neared Vietnam, and after making landfall in the country on November 6, Tess dissipated the next day.

Tropical Storm Tess and its precursor disturbance brought extensive flooding to much of the central Philippines. In Cebu, eight people were killed, and many homes and bridges were destroyed. The province of Palawan, a geographically isolated island from the rest of the country, suffered severe damage due to mudslides and flooding. There, 75 people were confirmed to have died, and 600 others were later presumed to have perished. In the suburbs of the capital city of Manila, 3,000 people were forced to flee their homes due to rising floodwaters. In all, there were a total of 686 deaths in the country. Nationwide, 144,136 people were evacuated to shelter, and 86 homes were destroyed, with 430 others receiving damage. Damage in the country totaled $11.38 million (1988 USD). In addition to the impact on the Philippines, Tess killed 55 people and inflicted $11 million in damage in Vietnam.

== Meteorological history ==
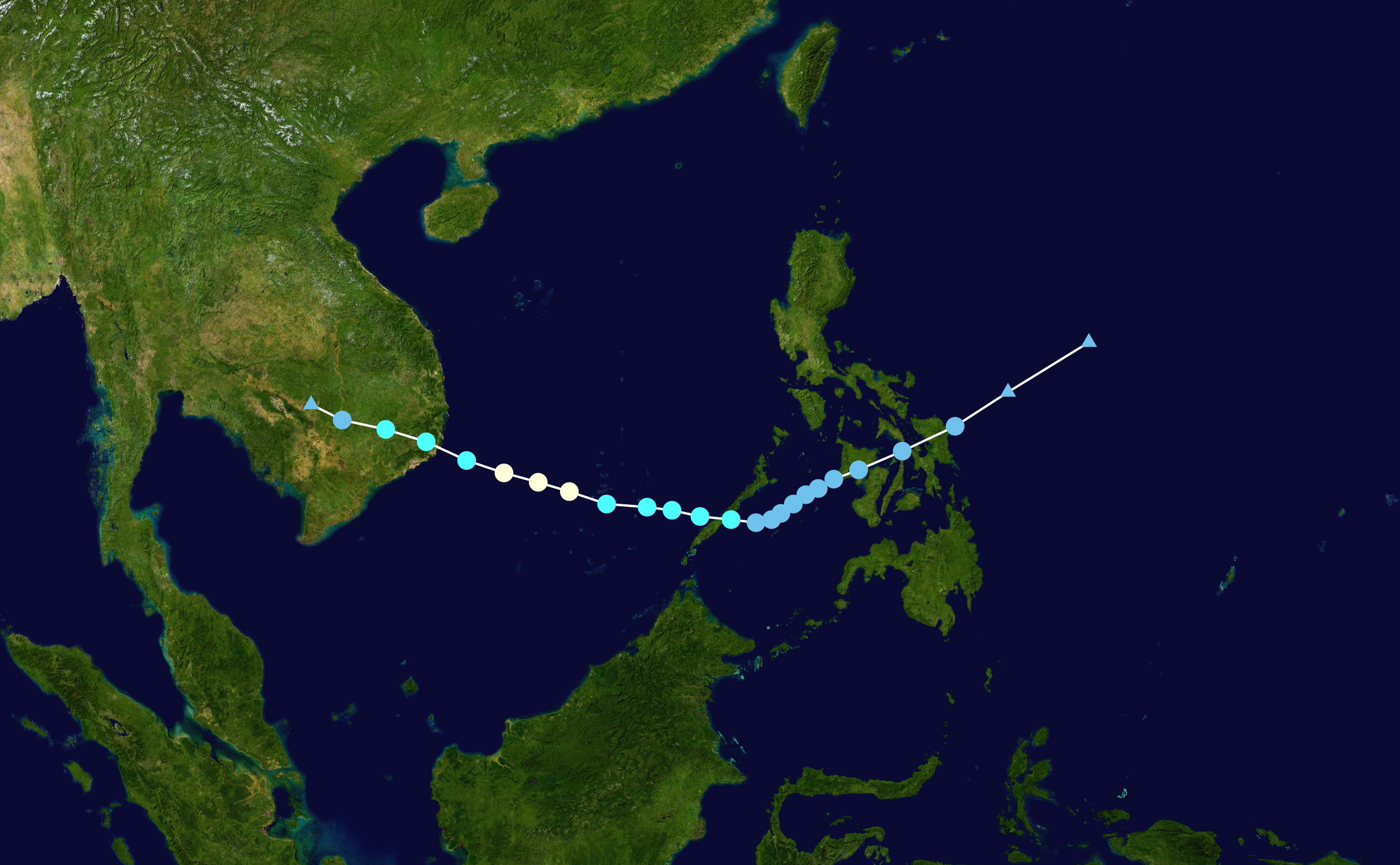
Map plotting the storm's track and intensity, according to the Saffir–Simpson scale Map key Saffir–Simpson scale Tropical depression (≤38 mph, ≤62 km/h) Tropical storm (39–73 mph, 63–118 km/h) Category 1 (74–95 mph, 119–153 km/h) Category 2 (96–110 mph, 154–177 km/h) Category 3 (111–129 mph, 178–208 km/h) Category 4 (130–156 mph, 209–251 km/h) Category 5 (≥157 mph, ≥252 km/h) Unknown Storm type Tropical cyclone Subtropical cyclone Extratropical cyclone, remnant low, tropical disturbance, or monsoon depression

In what would later become the second of two tropical cyclones to form within the basin during November 1988, an area of disturbed weather was first noted by the Joint Typhoon Warning Center (JTWC) early on November 1. Six hours later, the Japan Meteorological Agency (JMA) started following the system. (Note: The Japan Meteorological Agency is the official Regional Specialized Meteorological Center for the western Pacific Ocean.) The same day, the Philippine Atmospheric, Geophysical and Astronomical Services Administration also started to track the storm and assigned it with the local name Welpring. Over the next three days, the disturbance tracked southwest while embedded within the northeasterly flow of the winter monsoon. After passing through the Visayas island group and emerging into the open water of the Sulu Sea, the system began to increase in organization. At 17:30 UTC on November 3, the JTWC issued a Tropical Cyclone Formation Alert. At 00:00 UTC the next day, the JTWC classified the system as a tropical depression, citing satellite intensity estimates of 55 km/h (35 mph), while the JMA upgraded it to tropical storm intensity. (Note: Wind estimates from the JMA and most other basins throughout the world are sustained over 10 minutes, while estimates from the United States-based Joint Typhoon Warning Center are sustained over 1 minute. 10-minute winds are about 1.14 times the amount of 1-minute winds.) At this time, the tropical cyclone was centered 620 km (385 mi) south of Manila.

Almost immediately after the upgrades, the storm's track shifted from southwestward to westward in response to a trough weakening to the north; this also weakened the pressure gradient between the trough and a nearby ridge starting on November 4. In turn, wind shear decreased and allowed the storm to intensify. Following an increase in satellite intensity estimates, the JTWC upgraded the depression into a tropical storm, and named it Tess, at 06:00 UTC. As the storm tracked over the South China Sea, strengthening continued. On November 5, the JMA upgraded Tess into a severe tropical storm. At midday, the JTWC estimated that Tess attained typhoon intensity, which was also its maximum intensity of 120 km/h (75 mph). At 18:00 UTC on November 5, the JMA reported that Tess attained winds of 115 km/h (70 mph) and a barometric pressure of 975 mbar (30 inHg), its peak intensities in terms of both winds and pressure. Data from the JTWC suggests the storm weakened rapidly as it approached Vietnam. At 00:00 UTC on November 6, the JTWC stopped tracking the system; however, intensity estimates from the JMA had only decreased slightly during this time, and continued to classify Tess as a severe tropical storm. Tess then moved across the Mekong River delta, moving ashore midday about 240 km (150 mi) east-northeast of Ho Chi Minh City. By early November 7, the JMA stopped tracking the system.

== Impact and aftermath ==
By moving across the central Philippines in its formative phases, Tess became the second tropical cyclone to impact the island group within two weeks; the first was Typhoon Ruby. At least nine people were killed in the provinces of Cebu and Bukidnon, where the storm also rendered 600 people homeless. Eight of those deaths occurred in Cebu. There, the storm brought flash flooding that destroyed numerous bridges and homes. Palawan Island, a rugged, sparsely populated island chain isolated from the rest of the country, sustained widespread destruction from Tess, primarily due to flooding and landslides. On the island, the town of Rizal sustained the worst damage from the storm. There, 23 fatalities occurred. The island's north-south coastal road was covered in 7.5 ft (2.3 m) of water. By November 10, 75 people were confirmed to have been killed throughout Palawan, with 600 others subsequently listed as missing by the Philippine Red Cross. The missing were presumed dead by December 14. In part because the water level was already 5.5 ft (1.7 m) above normal due to Ruby, Laguna Lake, situated on the southeastern side of the capital city of Manila, overflowed its banks. This forced 3,000 people, mainly in the suburbs of Pasig, Taguig and Pateros, to evacuate their homes. Outside Palawan Island, Tess only resulted in 11 fatalities only in the island chain, all due to flooding.

Nationwide, the storm was blamed for 686 deaths. Additionally, 144,136 people or 28,824 families were evacuated to shelters as a result of the flooding. A total of 86 homes were destroyed and 430 others were damaged. Furthermore, damage to private property totaled $7.58 million (1988 USD). In addition, the storm caused $3.8 million in damage to agriculture. Overall, the nation suffered $11.38 million damage due to the cyclone. (Note: All Philippine currencies are converted to United States Dollars using Philippines Measuring worth with an exchange rate of the year 1988.)

Even though the storm had drastically weakened by this time, it still caused significant devastation in Vietnam — resulting in 55 deaths, 83 people reported missing, and the destruction or sweeping away of more than 13,000 homes. The storm also inflicted an estimated $11 million in damage. Following Tess, Philippine President Corazon Aquino visited the provinces of Pangasinan and Pampanga, both situated to the north of Manila to tour damaged areas, distribute relief, aid and inaugurate an infrastructure project. A mere few days after Tess, Typhoon Skip became the third cyclone to hit the archipelago in two weeks.

== See also ==
- Other tropical cyclones named Tess
- Tropical Storm Usagi (2018)
