= Typhoon Emma (1967) =

Pacific typhoon in 1967

Typhoon Emma (Welming)
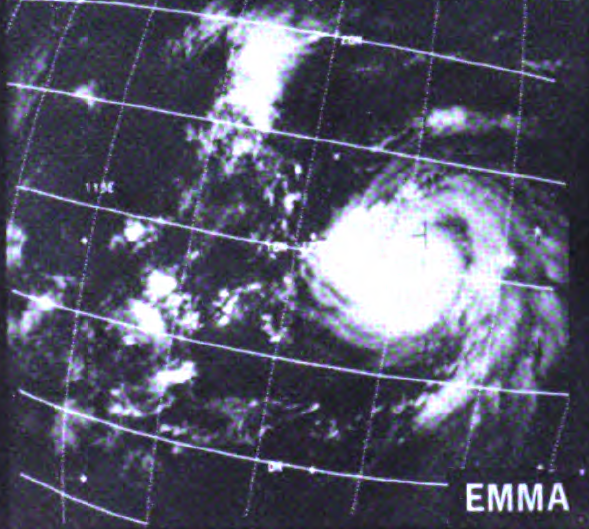
- Emma east of the Philippines on November 2

Meteorological history
- Formed: October 30, 1967
- Dissipated: November 8, 1967

Unknown-strength storm
- 10-minute sustained (JMA)
- Lowest pressure: 908 hPa (mbar); 26.81 inHg

Category 5-equivalent super typhoon
- 1-minute sustained (SSHWS/JTWC)
- Highest winds: 260 km/h (160 mph)
- Lowest pressure: 908 hPa (mbar); 26.81 inHg

Overall effects
- Fatalities: >300
- Damage: $75.6 million (1967 USD)
- Areas affected: Yap; Palau; Philippines; South China
- Part of the 1967 Pacific typhoon season

Typhoon Emma, known as Typhoon Welming in the Philippines, was a deadly typhoon that affected the Philippines, Yap, Palau, and South China. The forth super typhoon on 1967 season, the storm formed as tropical depression on October 30 and was upgraded to a typhoon the following day. On November 2, the storm reached peak intensity winds of 260 km/h (160 mph). Emma made its first landfall in southern Luzon and its final landfall on Zhanjiang as tropical storm. The storm dissipated on November 8 between China and Vietnam.

Emma caused $635,000 property damages on Palau and Yap. In the Philippines, more than 300 deaths and $75.6 million (1967 USD) in damages were reported. Two ships sank and many more were damaged. Emma left more than 140,000 homeless in the Philippines.

== Meteorological history ==
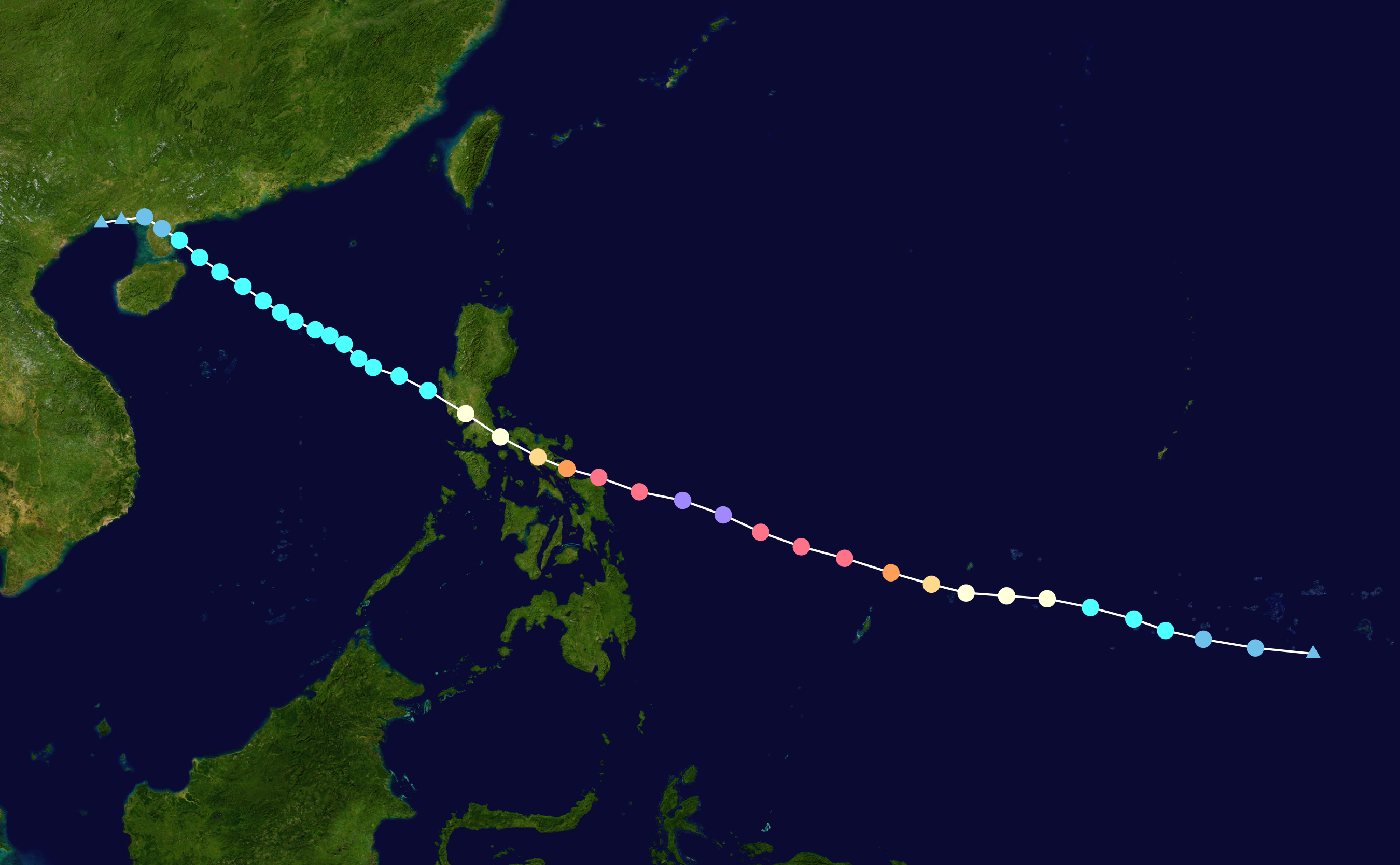
Map plotting the storm's track and intensity, according to the Saffir–Simpson scale Map key Saffir–Simpson scale Tropical depression (≤38 mph, ≤62 km/h) Tropical storm (39–73 mph, 63–118 km/h) Category 1 (74–95 mph, 119–153 km/h) Category 2 (96–110 mph, 154–177 km/h) Category 3 (111–129 mph, 178–208 km/h) Category 4 (130–156 mph, 209–251 km/h) Category 5 (≥157 mph, ≥252 km/h) Unknown Storm type Tropical cyclone Subtropical cyclone Extratropical cyclone, remnant low, tropical disturbance, or monsoon depression

Emma first originated as tropical depression by the Japan Meteorological Agency (JMA) on October 30. On October 31, the depression updated tropical storm about 200 mi south-southwest of Guam. At 12:00 UTC, both the JMA and JTWC upgraded the storm to typhoon intensity. Moving on a west-northwest track, Emma crossed into Philippine Area of Responsibility (PAR) on November 1, getting renamed Welming. Emma began rapid intensification, reaching winds of 150 km/h (93 mph) on November 1 while passing about 60 mi (97 km) south of Yap. The next day, Emma reached 232 km/h (144 mph) and by 6:00 UTC, Emma was upgraded to super typhoon intensity. Six hours later, Emma reached peak winds of 260 km/h (160 mph). On November 3, Emma reached a peak minimum pressure of 908 hPa (26.8 inHg) over east Samar.

At 12:00 UTC on November 3, Emma made landfall over southern Luzon with one-minute sustained winds of 200 km/h (120 mph). Emma, weakened by Luzon's mountainous terrain, emerged as a tropical storm and continued to weaken as it traversed the South China Sea. On November 5, Emma exited the Philippine Area of Responsibility. At 0:00 UTC, Emma made its final landfall over Zhanjiang with one-minute sustained winds of 55 km/h (34 mph). JTWC ceased tracking the cyclone at 0:00 UTC of November 8 and on November 8 at 18:00 UTC, JMA stopped advisories over between China and Vietnam.

== Impact ==
=== Philippines ===
An initial damage estimates gave $5 million, but on November 6, Philippine officials estimated damages of approximately $75 million. The Philippine Red Cross reported approximately 26,000 families and 140,000 people left homeless in 21 provinces. The Philippine News Service declared 300 fatalities and at least 67 people missing in five provinces. In Manila Bay, 64 people were left unaccounted for when six boats were overturned. In Samar, a bus fell into a river after a bridge collapsed, causing 23 people to drown. In Pampanga, a pregnant woman was killed by a falling tree and in Manila, a man was struck by a collapsed billboard. Police attempting to reach the municipally of Bacon were struck by a tidal wave.

The U.S Clark Air Base, located 40 miles northwest of Metro Manila, was damaged. The storm affected downtown Manila caused uprooted trees and damaged power lines and destroyed houses and damaged billboards. In Manila, one person killed and 5 others injured. The ferry Morning Glory was sank in Manila Bay with unknown number of people aboard. Manila radar tracking equipment damaged. 15% drop of damaging coconut industry. The Japanese Hoku Maru ran aground on the northwestern coast. Number of districts in the city, and suburbs without power more than 12 hours. The Mindoro sank on November 4 resulted in the deaths of 170 people, including 90 people, 134 passengers were rescued.

=== Elsewhere ===
The typhoon damaged papaya and banana trees. Property damages in Palau and Yap estimated at $635,000. No people died in Palau and Yap. Coral causeways were washed out. Koror reported wind gusts of 55 mph (89 km/h), with heavy rain, causing minor damage.

In China, the storm caused unknown damages. The Habib Marikar suffered a engine failure, USS Navarro rescued 43 of crew. The Liberian flag freighter Loyal Fortunes swept aground, USS Coral Sea rescued 37 all men at Pratas Reef about 170 miles (270 km) southeast of Hong Kong. Three ships ran aground in the South China Sea.

== Retirement ==
The Philippine name Welming was retired due to the extreme death toll, and was replaced by Warling, first used in the 1971 season.
