= Typhoon Joan =

Pacific typhoon in 1970

Typhoon Joan (Sening)
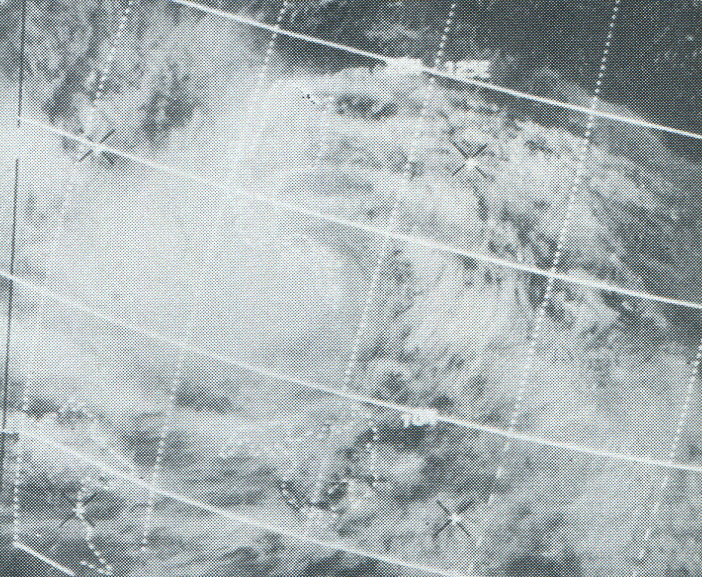
- Typhoon Joan was the largest typhoon in size during the 1970 season, as seen in this image.

Meteorological history
- Formed: October 10, 1970
- Dissipated: October 18, 1970

Unknown-strength storm
- 10-minute sustained (JMA)
- Lowest pressure: 905 hPa (mbar); 26.72 inHg

Category 5-equivalent super typhoon
- 1-minute sustained (SSHWS/JTWC)
- Highest winds: 280 km/h (175 mph)
- Lowest pressure: 901 hPa (mbar); 26.61 inHg

Overall effects
- Fatalities: 768 direct
- Damage: $74 million
- Areas affected: Caroline Islands; Philippines; Hainan Island; Southeastern China; Hong Kong
- IBTrACS
- Part of the 1970 Pacific typhoon season

Typhoon Joan, known in the Philippines as Typhoon Sening, was the first of two super typhoons to strike the Philippines within a week in October 1970, the second being Super Typhoon Kate. Typhoon Joan is the fourth strongest typhoon ever to affect the Philippines, just after typhoons Haiyan in 2013, Meranti in 2016, and Goni in 2020.

== Meteorological history ==
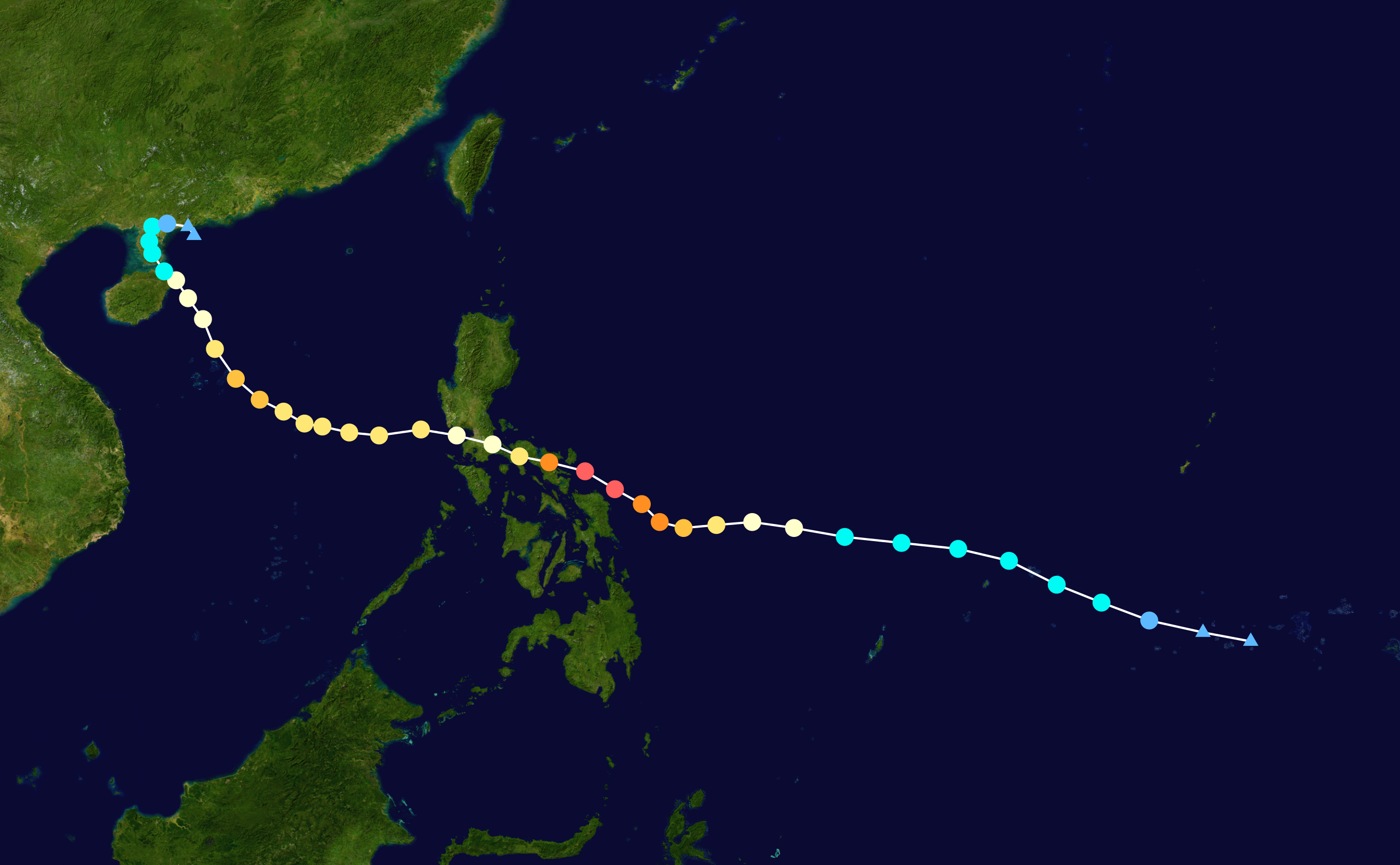
Map plotting the storm's track and intensity, according to the Saffir–Simpson scale Map key Saffir–Simpson scale Tropical depression (≤38 mph, ≤62 km/h) Tropical storm (39–73 mph, 63–118 km/h) Category 1 (74–95 mph, 119–153 km/h) Category 2 (96–110 mph, 154–177 km/h) Category 3 (111–129 mph, 178–208 km/h) Category 4 (130–156 mph, 209–251 km/h) Category 5 (≥157 mph, ≥252 km/h) Unknown Storm type Tropical cyclone Subtropical cyclone Extratropical cyclone, remnant low, tropical disturbance, or monsoon depression

A tropical disturbance was first detected on October 8 near Truk (now Chuuk) and Ponape (now Pohnpei). Due to the wind and sea conditions, the disturbance moved west quicker than expected at near 17 knots (31 km/h or 20 mph). A circulation developed on the morning of October 9, and it was a tropical storm by the time it passed Ulithi Atoll.

Joan continued to strengthen, and by October 11 had become a typhoon. However, it had slowed in forward speed due to it moving near an anticyclone that was located 300 miles (480 km) southeast of Okinawa. As Joan continued to strengthen, it reacted to the ridge line, and turned to the northwest, aiming the storm straight at the Bicol Peninsula of Luzon.

An aerial reconnaissance crew (similar to Hurricane Hunters) sent to investigate Joan on October 13 encountered severe turbulence and a g-force reading of 2.5 gs as the storm was at its peak. The readings sent back put Joan with 150 knot (280 km/h or 175 mph) winds and a minimum central pressure of 905 mb.

The storm made landfall near noon the same day in the Lagonoy Gulf region of Luzon, but not before it had threatened and brushed the coast of Catanduanes Island. Bicol and Tagalog Provinces were affected as the storm continued to move across Luzon, losing strength. On October 14, the storm passed within 20 miles (32 km) south of Manila as a minimal typhoon.

Joan then entered the South China Sea. However, its path over Luzon had caused it to lose organisation around the vertical structure of the central eye region of Joan. Over October 14 and 15, the area of gale-force (tropical storm-force) winds grew to a 250-mile (400 km)- (400 km) radius from its center. Its eye diameter also grew to 80 miles (130 km) - double the average eye diameter. This area filled almost the whole northern South China Sea and made Joan the largest storm of the season in size.

A trough over central China interacted with the ridge line and made Joan turned more northerly, and the storm took aim at the northeastern tip of Hainan Island on October 17. It made landfall on the Luichow Peninsula (now Leizhou Peninsula) as a minimal typhoon and dissipated over southern China on October 18.

== Impact ==
A United States Coast Guard LORAN station on Catanduanes, 30 miles (50 km) north of where the centre of the storm passed, recorded a windspeed of 90 knots (165 km/h or 105 mph) gusting to 110 knots (205 km/h or 130 mph). In Virac, on the island, the Philippine Weather Bureau station recorded a minimum sea level pressure of 950.7 mb and winds of 150 knots (280 km/h), but was heavily damaged.

Typhoon Joan made a direct hit on Naga City, where many people died from flying debris, collapsing homes, falling trees and floods. By doing so, the storm became the most intense storm ever of the Bicol Region — until it was surpassed by Typhoon Durian in 2006.

Manila International Airport reported a peak gust of 84 knots (156 km/h or 97 mph) and a minimum pressure reading of 976.9 mb, while a U.S. Coast Guard ship, the USCGC Blackhaw anchored in Manila Bay reported a 75-knot (139 km/h) gust.

The storm caused damage bad enough to rank high as some of the most destructive figures ever. Joan left over 80,000 people homeless, in addition to killing 575 people (193 people were unaccounted for, and have since been declared dead, bringing the total toll to 768) and injuring nearly 1600. US$74 million (1970 USD, $373 million 2005 USD) of damage was estimated, along with a 92% loss of agricultural crop in the regions affected. Later that same week, Super Typhoon Kate devastated the Philippines, making conditions worse.

Shipping traffic in the South China Sea was severely disrupted. USS Agerholm (DD-826), a 3,500 ton US Navy destroyer with 360 men on board, experienced 40 foot waves and 75 mph winds for 2 days close to the Paracel Islands. The ship was reported missing and was almost lost with all hands on board. There is a lack of information about damage and deaths in China.

== See also ==
- List of super typhoons
- Typhoon Vera (Bebeng) - a weaker typhoon that affected the same areas in 1983
- Typhoon Angela (Rosing) - a super typhoon that affected the same areas of the Philippines in 1995
- Typhoon Durian (Reming) - a similar typhoon that affected the same areas of the Philippines in 2006
- Typhoon Haiyan (Yolanda) - one of the strongest landfalling typhoons that affected central portions of the Philippines in 2013
- Typhoon Rammasun (Glenda) - a similar typhoon that also affected the same areas in 2014
- Typhoon Goni (Rolly) - the strongest landfalling cyclone that also affected the same areas 50 years later (2020)
