= Typhoon Kate =

Pacific typhoon in 1970

Typhoon Kate (Titang)
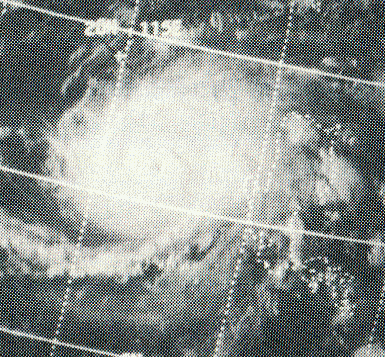
- Typhoon Kate west of the Philippines on October 22

Meteorological history
- Formed: October 14, 1970
- Dissipated: October 25, 1970

Typhoon
- 10-minute sustained (JMA)
- Lowest pressure: 940 hPa (mbar); 27.76 inHg

Category 4-equivalent super typhoon
- 1-minute sustained (SSHWS/JTWC)
- Highest winds: 240 km/h (150 mph)
- Lowest pressure: 941 hPa (mbar); 27.79 inHg

Overall effects
- Fatalities: 631
- Missing: 284
- Damage: $50 million (1970 USD)
- Areas affected: Philippines, Indonesia, Vietnam
- IBTrACS
- Part of the 1970 Pacific typhoon season

Typhoon Kate, known in the Philippines as Typhoon Titang, was the second of two super typhoons to strike the Philippines within a week in October 1970, the first being Super Typhoon Joan. As a result, Kate produced heavy damage and over 631 casualties. At the time, Kate was one of the deadliest typhoons to strike the Philippines.

== Meteorological history ==
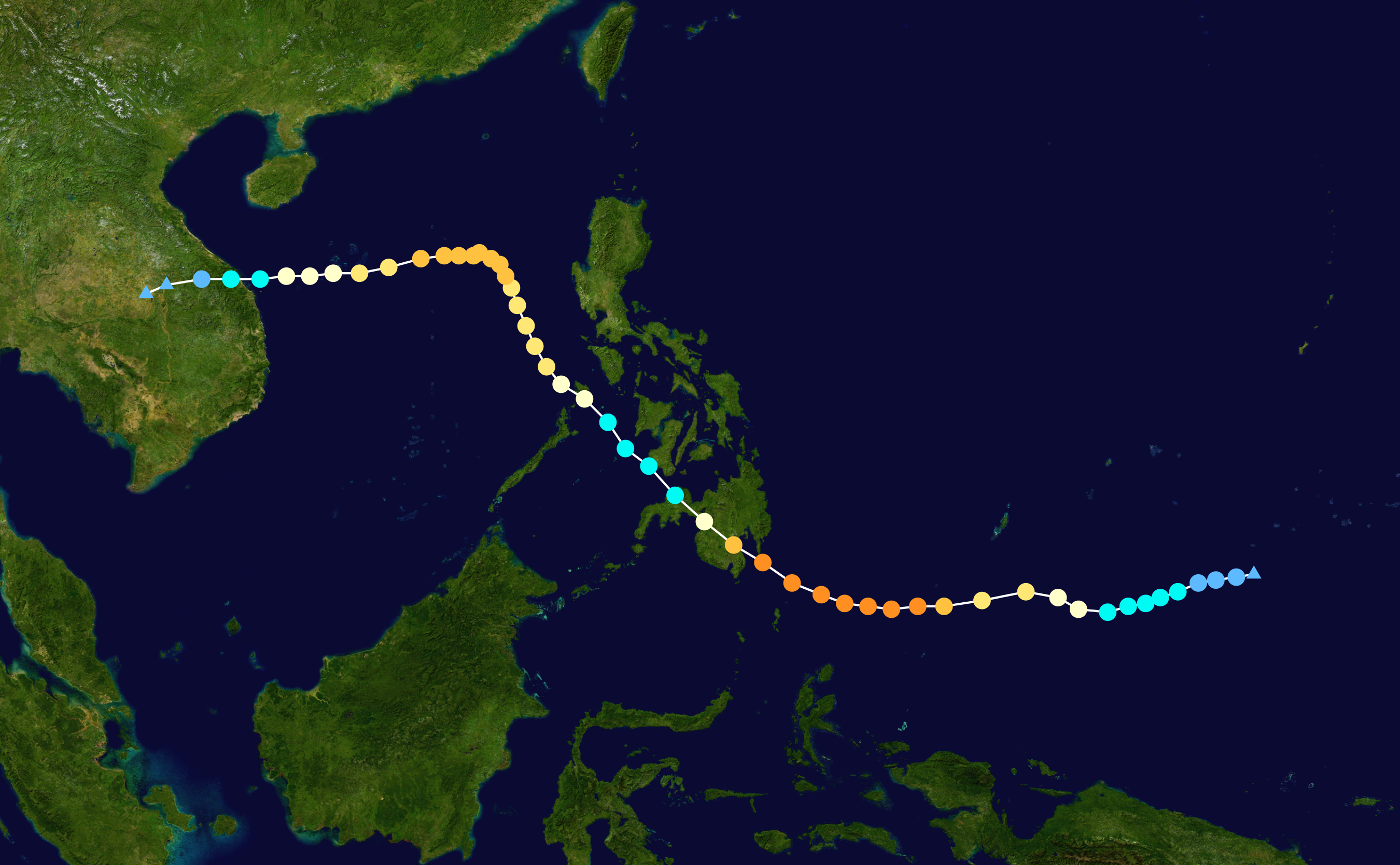
Map plotting the storm's track and intensity, according to the Saffir–Simpson scale Map key Saffir–Simpson scale Tropical depression (≤38 mph, ≤62 km/h) Tropical storm (39–73 mph, 63–118 km/h) Category 1 (74–95 mph, 119–153 km/h) Category 2 (96–110 mph, 154–177 km/h) Category 3 (111–129 mph, 178–208 km/h) Category 4 (130–156 mph, 209–251 km/h) Category 5 (≥157 mph, ≥252 km/h) Unknown Storm type Tropical cyclone Subtropical cyclone Extratropical cyclone, remnant low, tropical disturbance, or monsoon depression

Super Typhoon Kate was first identified by the Joint Typhoon Warning Center (JTWC) on October 7, 1970, and by the Japan Meteorological Agency on October 9, 1970 as a tropical disturbance near the Marshall Islands. The system tracked in a general westward direction and relocated itself further south during this period in response to Typhoon Joan wake to the northwest. By October 13, convection sharply increased as the system entered a region of strong diffluence. The following day, the disturbance featured a marked increase in organization as thunderstorms continued to consolidate around the center of circulation. During the afternoon of October 15, reconnaissance aircraft reached the storm and reported that it was already nearing typhoon status. Sustained winds were measured at 110 km/h (68 mph) along with a barometric pressure of 985 mbar (hPa; 29.12 inHg). At this time the storm was classified as Tropical Storm Kate, the 18th named storm of the 1970 season. Additionally, the storm had begun developing an eyewall, an indication that the system was likely to intensify further. Over the following three days, the storm continued its westward track while gaining strength.

Throughout the day on October 16, Kate underwent a period of rapid intensification. During this time, sustained winds increased from 140 to 215 km/h (87 to 134 mph), ranking Kate as a Category 4 typhoon on the modern day Saffir–Simpson Hurricane Scale. Early on October 17, reconnaissance planes flown into the typhoon measured the eye to be 18.5 km (11.5 mi) in diameter. Although winds were still increasing, the lowest pressure recorded in relation to Kate was measured at this time at 940 mbar (hPa; 27.7 inHg). Further intensification ensued as the typhoon neared the southeastern Philippine island of Mindanao on October 18. Just before making a rare landfall roughly 45 km (28 mi) south of Davao City in the Davao Region, Kate attained its peak winds of 240 km/h (150 mph), classifying it as a super typhoon according to the JTWC. As the storm moved over land, the eye abruptly shrank to 7.4 km (4.6 mi) in diameter but this feature dissipated hours later.

Due to the interaction with the mountainous terrain of Mindanao, Kate quickly weakened as it moved northwestward across the archipelago. By October 19, the system had weakened to a tropical storm, less than 24 hours after attaining its peak winds. Despite the notable weakening, the structure of the storm remained relatively intact as it moved over the Sulu Sea. Throughout the day, the system briefly sped up before rapidly slowing near the South China Sea. On October 20, decreased interaction with land allowed Kate to re-attain typhoon status just before passing over Busuanga Island. Continuing its northwest track, the typhoon slowly intensified and redeveloped a 37 mi (23 mi) wide eye. Late on October 21, the JTWC assessed the storm to have re-attained Category 4 intensity; however, post-storm analysis indicated that sustained winds did not exceed 195 km/h (121 mph). The following day, a ridge to the north of Kate prevented the system from tracking further north and prompted a west-southwestward track.

Gradual weakening took place over the following several days as Kate slowly neared the Indochina coastline. By October 24, winds had decreased below 155 km/h (96 mph) and the eye became asymmetrical and partially open in the northeast quadrant. On October 25, the typhoon further weakened to a tropical storm just off the coast of Vietnam. Later that day, the system made its final landfall near Da Nang, Vietnam with winds of 100 km/h (62 mph). Rapid weakening ensued as Kate moved over the high terrain of southeast Asia, with the storm degrading to a tropical depression within six hours of moving inland. The system dissipated within the next 24 hours as it moved over the plateau region of Cambodia. Both JTWC and JMA released their final advisories as Kate dissipated over Vietnam.

== Impact ==
=== Philippines ===
Mindanao is situated outside the typhoon belt due to its close proximity to the equator. Typhoons rarely hit the island, often curving northward and making landfall in the more northern parts of the country. When Kate made landfall in southern Mindanao, the large loss of life from the typhoon is thought to be related to the lack of tropical cyclone experience for its residents.

In southern Mindanao, over 5,000 houses and other such structures were damaged or destroyed by storm surge, heavy rains and strong winds produced by Typhoon Kate. Damage from the storm was estimated at $50 million, making it one of the costliest typhoons on record at the time. A total of 631 people were confirmed to have been killed by the storm and 284 others were listed as missing, ranking Kate as one of the deadliest typhoons to strike the Philippines at the time.

Initial reports from the Red Cross indicated that at least 150 homes were destroyed within hours of Kate's landfall. Telecommunication was lost to much of the region as power lines were down after being pummeled by high winds. Within a day of the storm's passage, the death toll had reached 13 with 29 others missing and was expected to increase.

=== Vietnam ===
Due to the threat of the typhoon, United States military officials prompted the evacuation of a military hospital near Da Nang and the relocation of aircraft. The level of fighting during Kate's passage was regarded as one of the lowest during the Vietnam War as most tactical bombing missions were canceled. During the 24 hours in which the storm affected Vietnam, the United States launched 46 air bombings, the fewest in over two years. Although damage estimates and reports of deaths are scarce out of Vietnam, floodwaters, considered the worst since 1964, affected an area nearly 140 square miles (360 km^{2}) south of Da Nang. Roughly 900 people were evacuated the first day after Kate by Marine Aircraft Group 16, and over 9,000 South Vietnamese were rescued by the 1st Marine Aircraft Wing, in Vietnam to fight the Vietnam War.

== See also ==
- List of Equatorial tropical cyclones
- Typhoon Bopha
