= 1947 Pacific typhoon season =

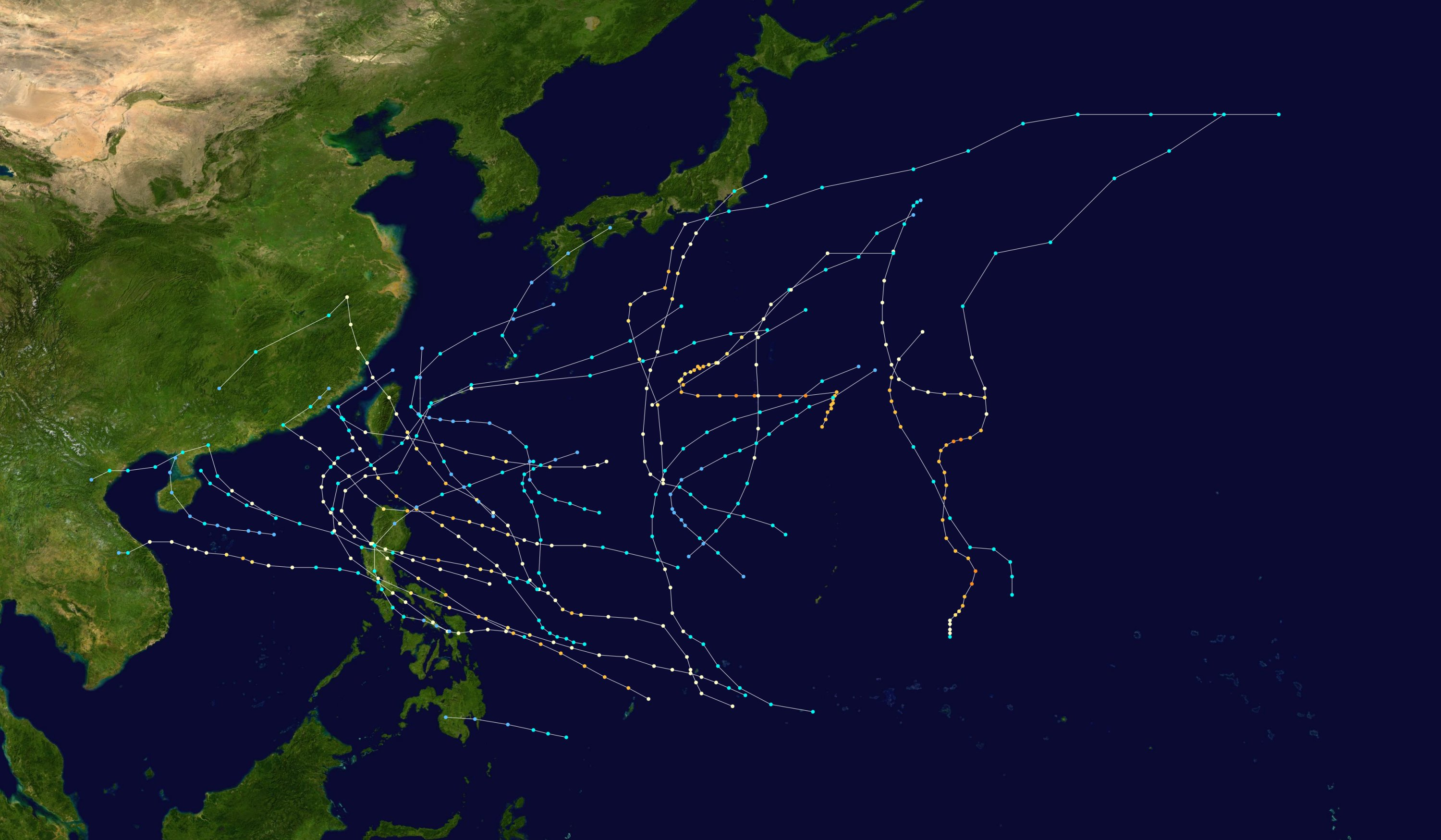
- Season summary map

Seasonal boundaries
- First system formed: March 18, 1947
- Last system dissipated: December 29, 1947

Strongest storm
- Name: Rosalind
  - Maximum winds: 240 km/h (150 mph) (1-minute sustained)
  - Lowest pressure: 918 hPa (mbar)

Seasonal statistics
- Total storms: 27
- Typhoons: 19
- Very strong typhoons: 1 (unofficial)
- Total fatalities: 1,077
- Total damage: Unknown

Related articles
- 1947 Atlantic hurricane season; 1942–1948 Pacific hurricane seasons; 1940s North Indian Ocean cyclone seasons

The 1947 Pacific typhoon season has no official bounds; it ran year-round in 1947, but most tropical cyclones tend to form in the northwestern Pacific Ocean between June and December. These dates conventionally delimit the period of each year when most tropical cyclones form in the northwestern Pacific Ocean.

The scope of this article is limited to the Pacific Ocean, north of the equator and west of the International Date Line. Storms that form east of the date line and north of the equator are called hurricanes; see 1947 Pacific hurricane season. At the time, tropical storms that formed within this region of the western Pacific were identified and named by the United States Armed Services, and these names are taken from the list that USAS publicly adopted before the 1945 season started.

== Summary ==
27 storms formed in the season, 19 of them reached typhoon status, and there was 1 super typhoon.

== Storms ==
=== Tropical Storm Anna ===
- Tropical storm (SSHWS)
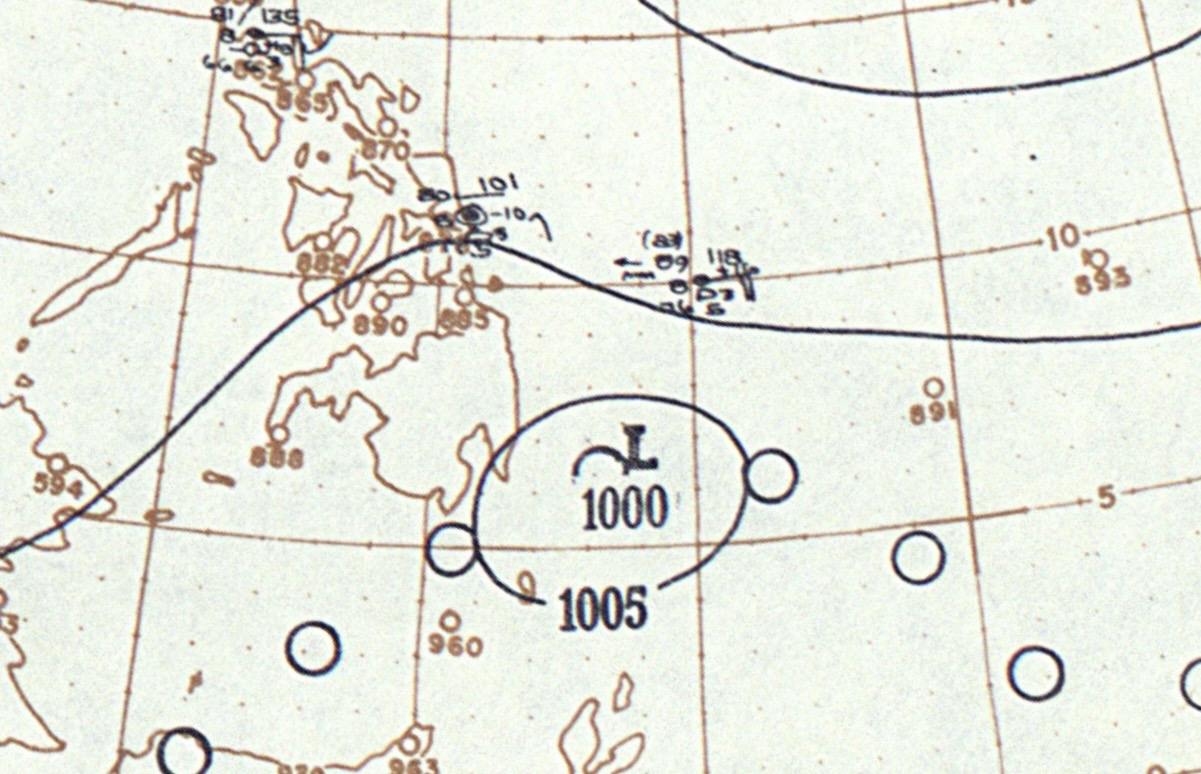
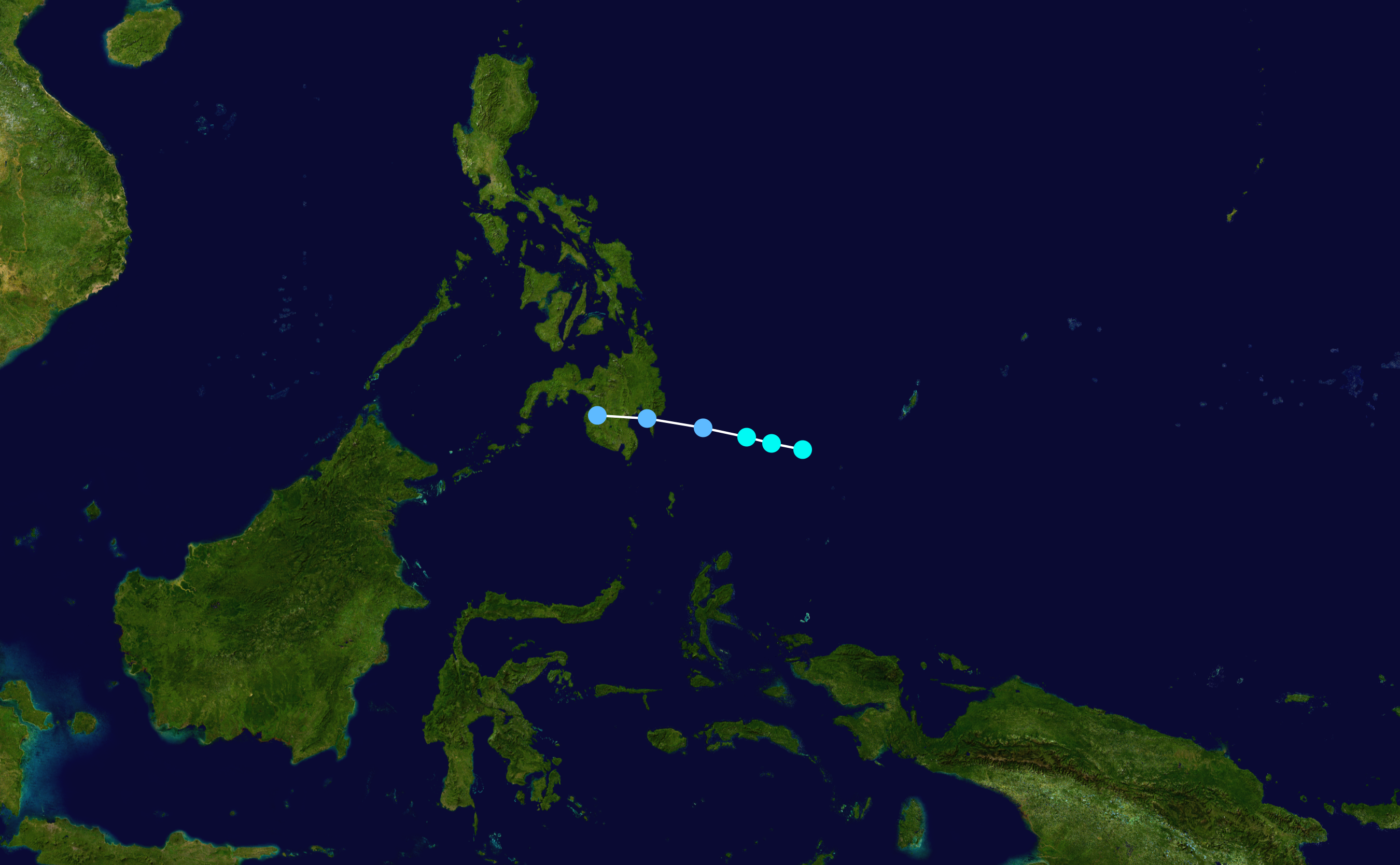
- Duration: March 18 – March 20
- Peak intensity: 65 km/h (40 mph) (1-min); 1001 hPa (mbar)

Anna originated from a vigorous tropical wave that moved west along the ITCZ during the days of March 16 and 17. On March 18 an approaching cold front caused the wave to congeal into a tropical low pressure system while about 415 miles (668 km) to the east of Davao. The system rapidly organized into a tropical storm and continued west. Anna made landfall on Mindanao on March 20 as a tropical depression and weakened quickly thereafter.

Little data is available for this system, but the U.S. Air Weather Service noted that the storm was of little significance.

=== Typhoon Bernida ===
- Category 1 typhoon (SSHWS)
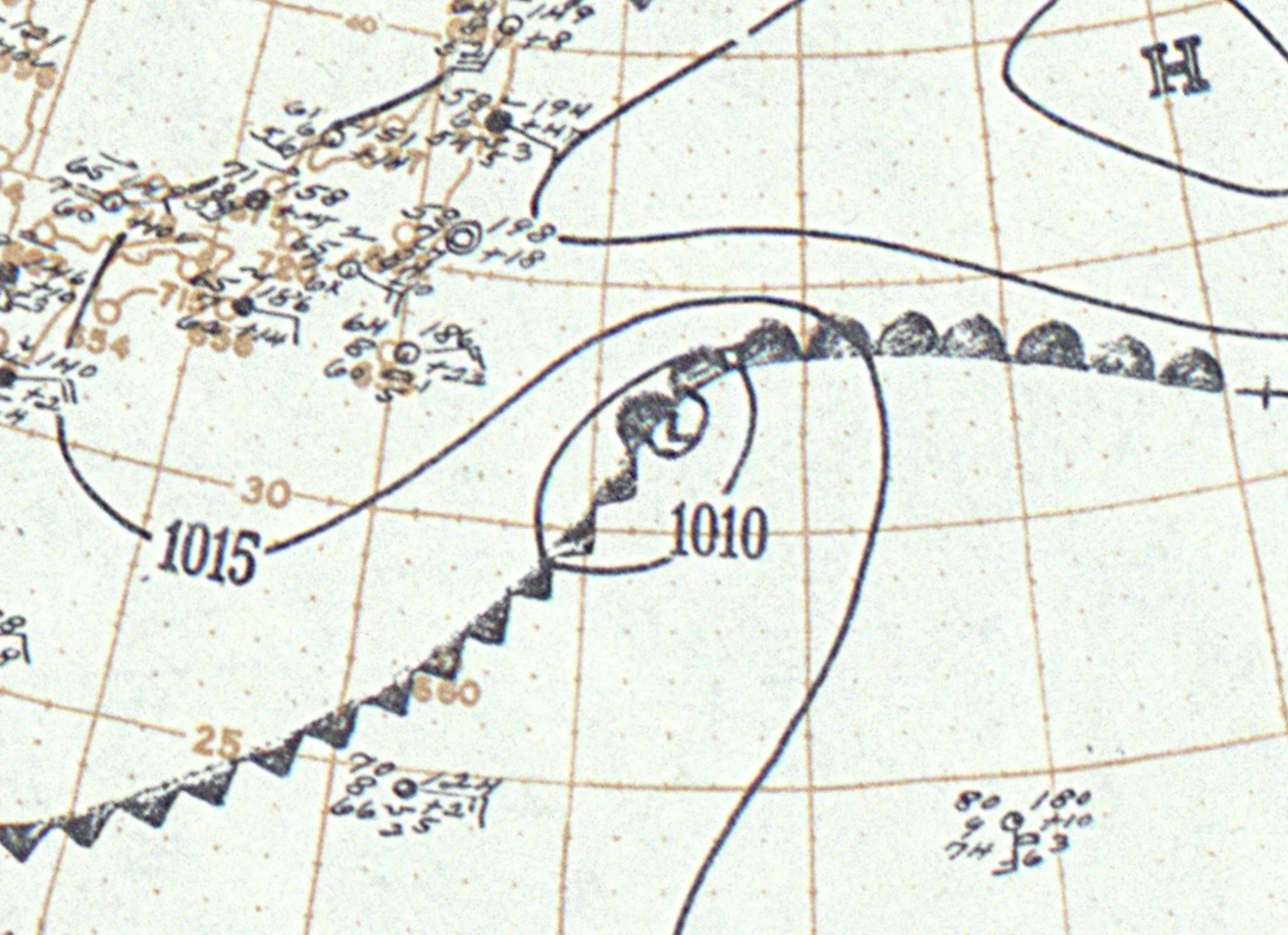
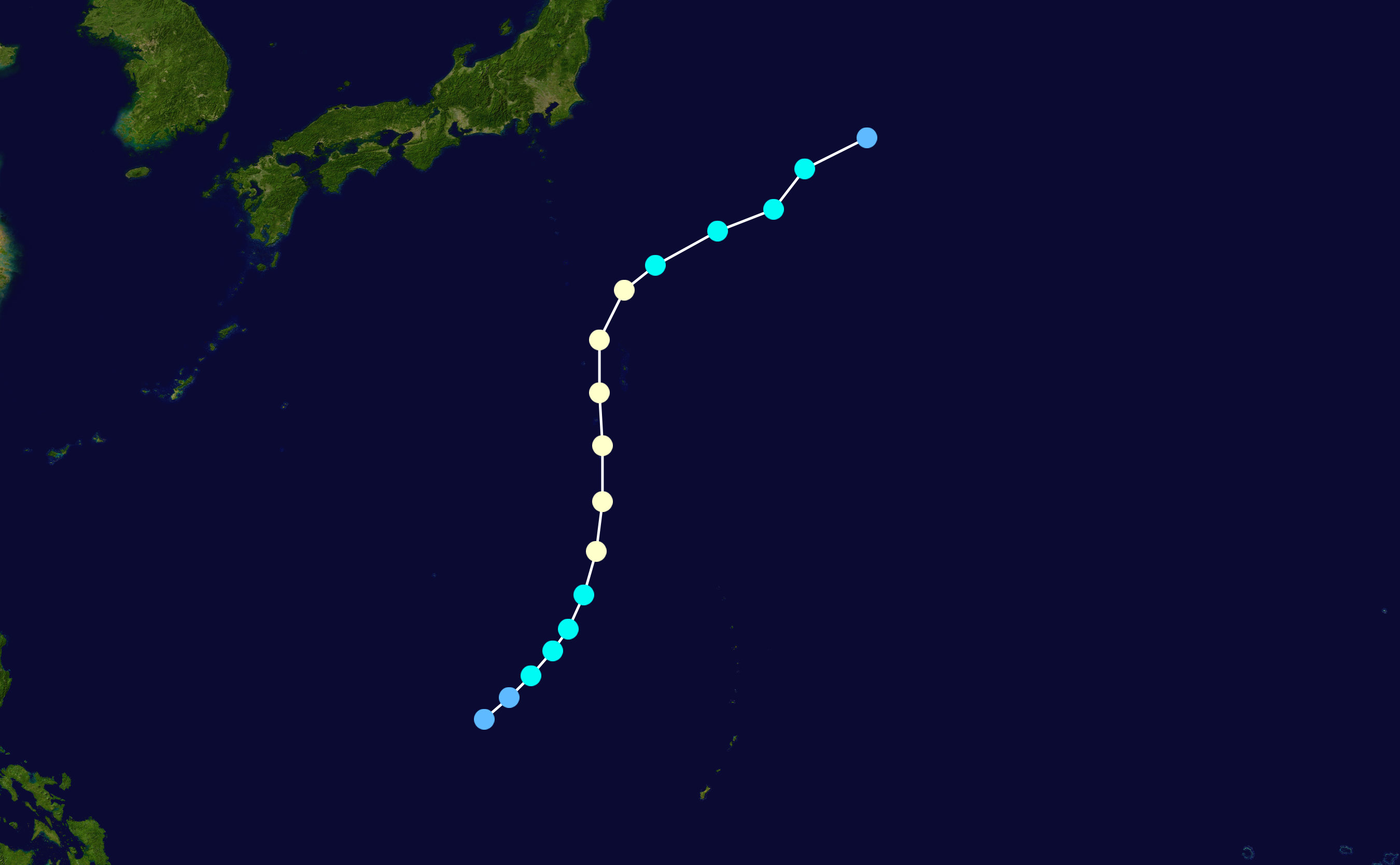
- Duration: May 13 – May 17
- Peak intensity: 150 km/h (90 mph) (1-min); 972 hPa (mbar)

The Joint Typhoon Warning center (JTWC) best tracks lists this system as 02W

=== Typhoon Carol ===
- Category 3 typhoon (SSHWS)
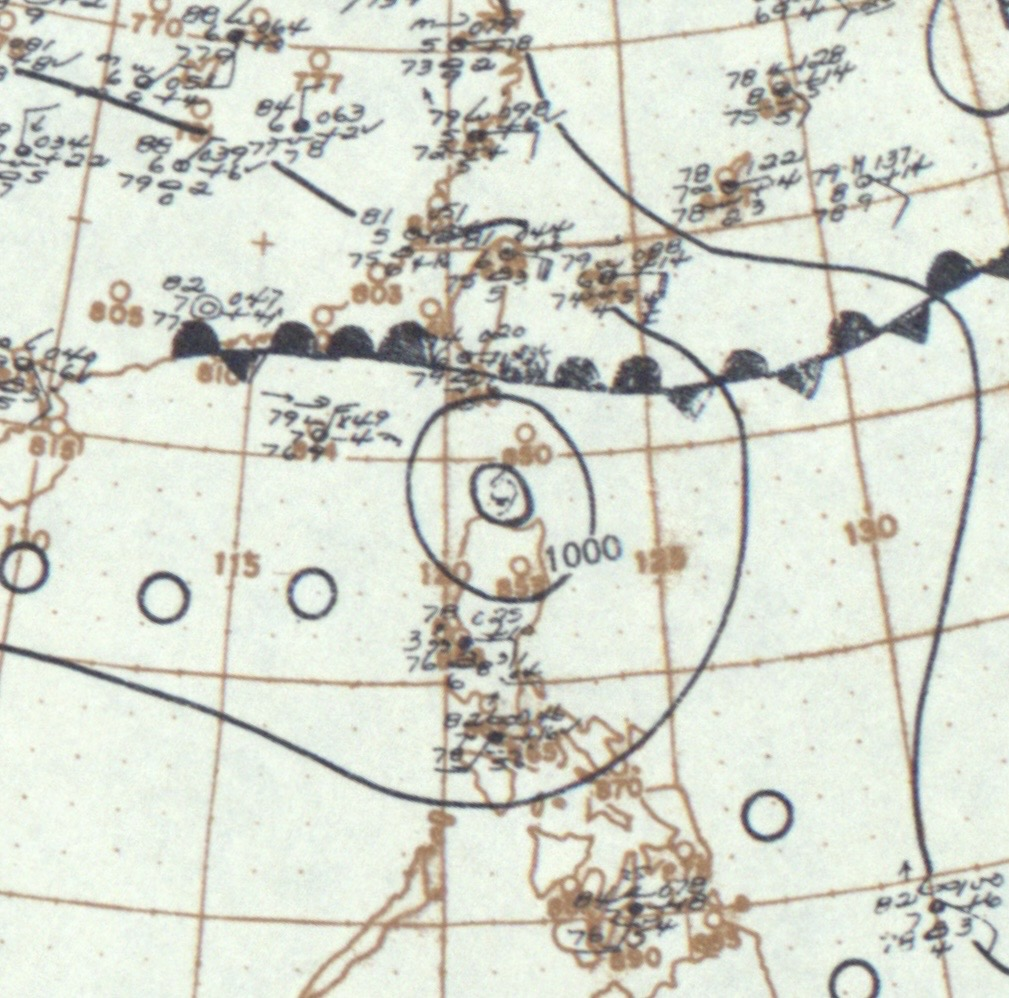
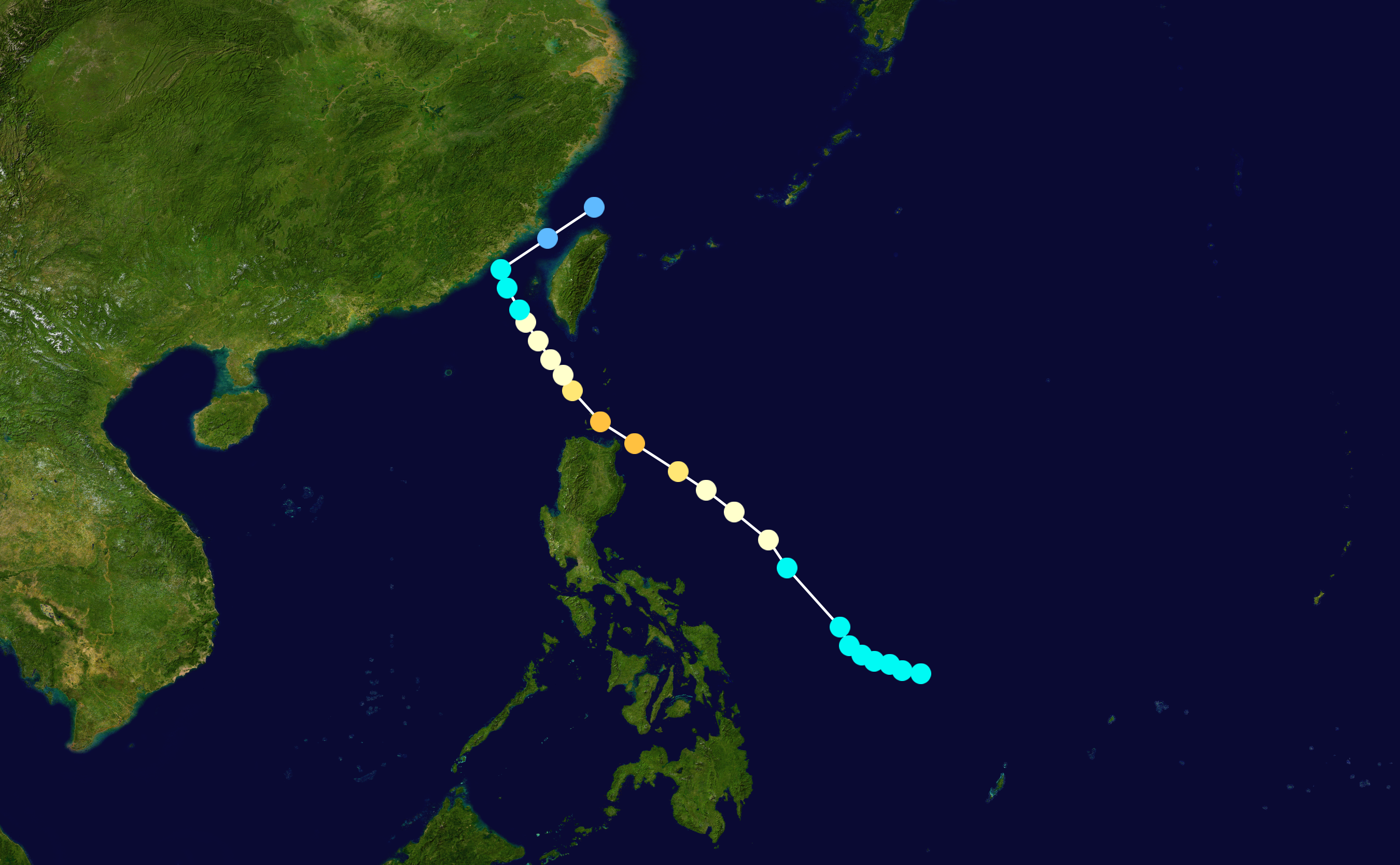
- Duration: June 17 – June 23
- Peak intensity: 185 km/h (115 mph) (1-min); 960 hPa (mbar)

Carol formed east of the Philippines on June 17. It moved northwest and skimmed right past the most northern island as a 115 mph typhoon. After that, it began to weaken. Carol passed by Taiwan, and was about to hit mainland China, but it suddenly took a northeast track. Shortly thereafter, Carol dissipated on June 23.

The Joint Typhoon Warning center (JTWC) best tracks lists this system as 03W.

=== Tropical Storm Donna ===
- Tropical storm (SSHWS)
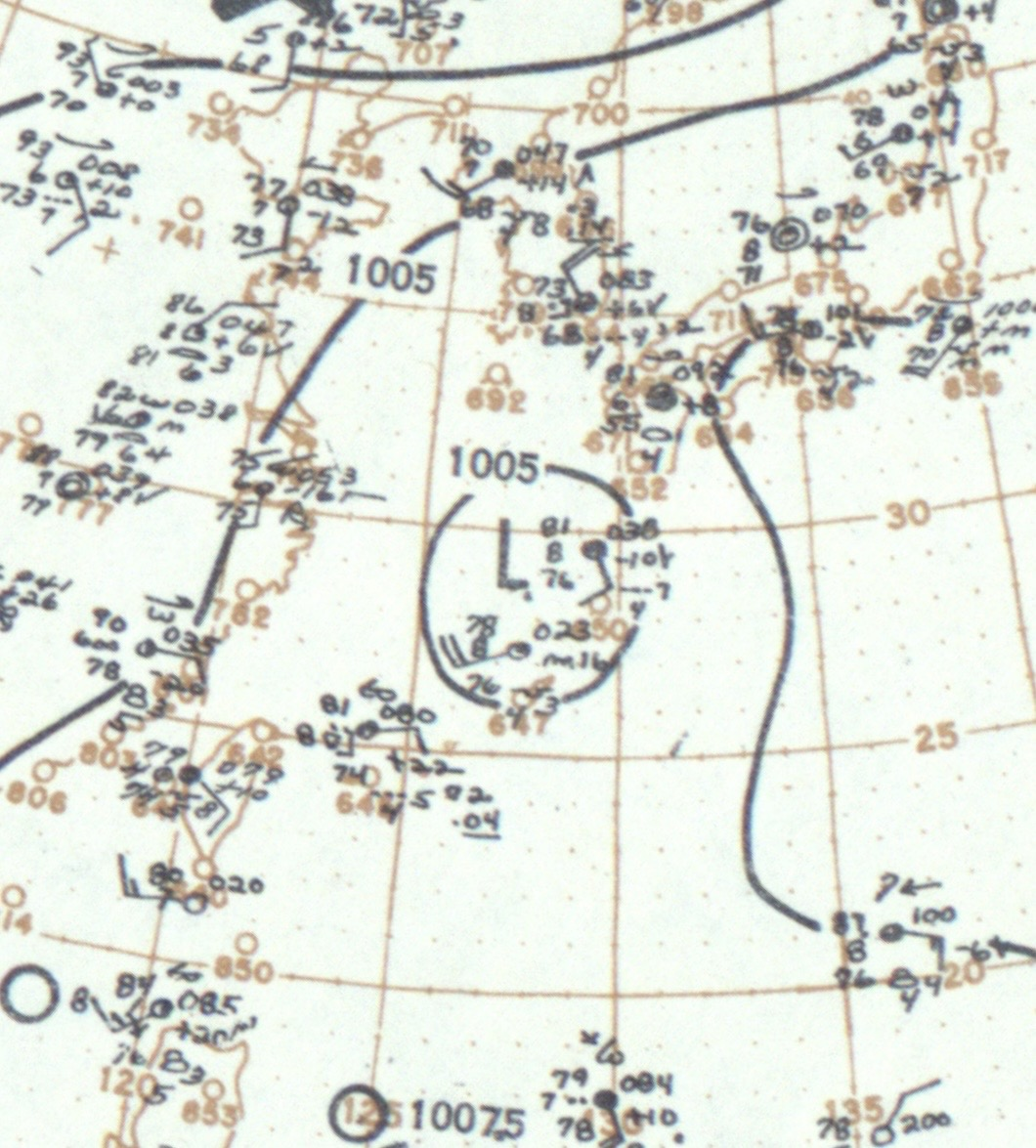
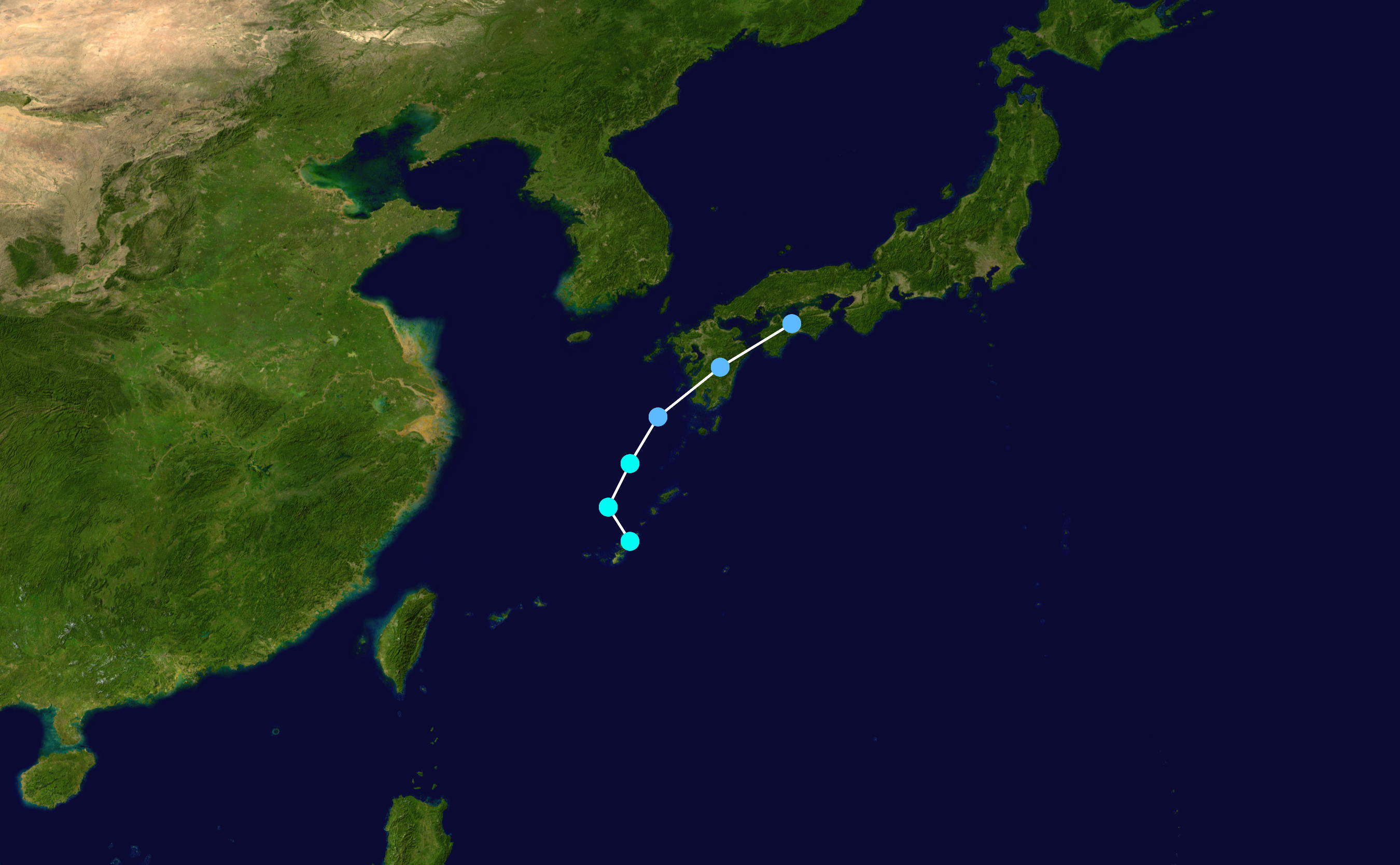
- Duration: July 8 – July 9
- Peak intensity: 65 km/h (40 mph) (1-min); 999 hPa (mbar)

The Joint Typhoon Warning center (JTWC) best tracks lists this system as 04W

=== Tropical Storm Eileen ===
- Tropical storm (SSHWS)
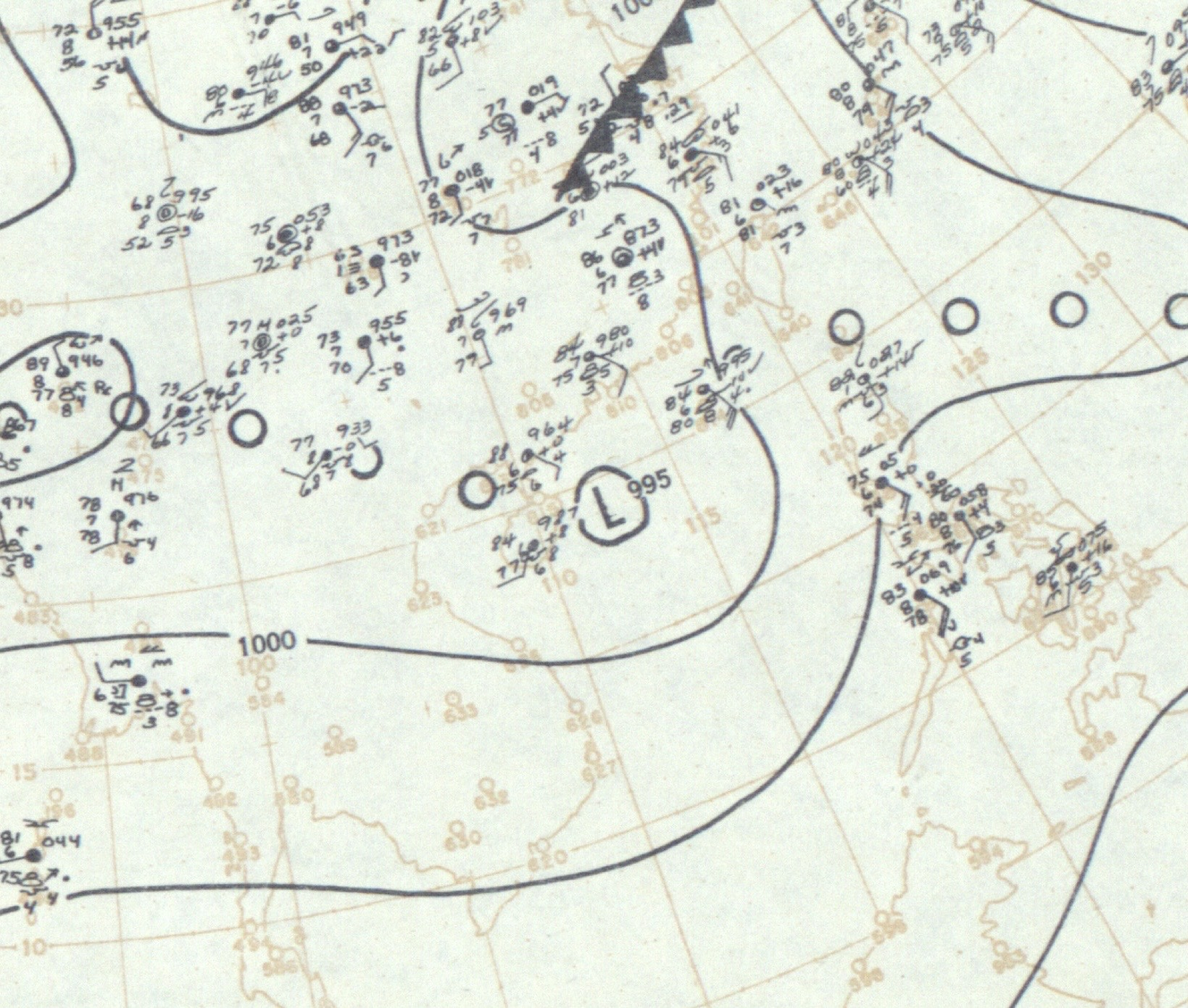
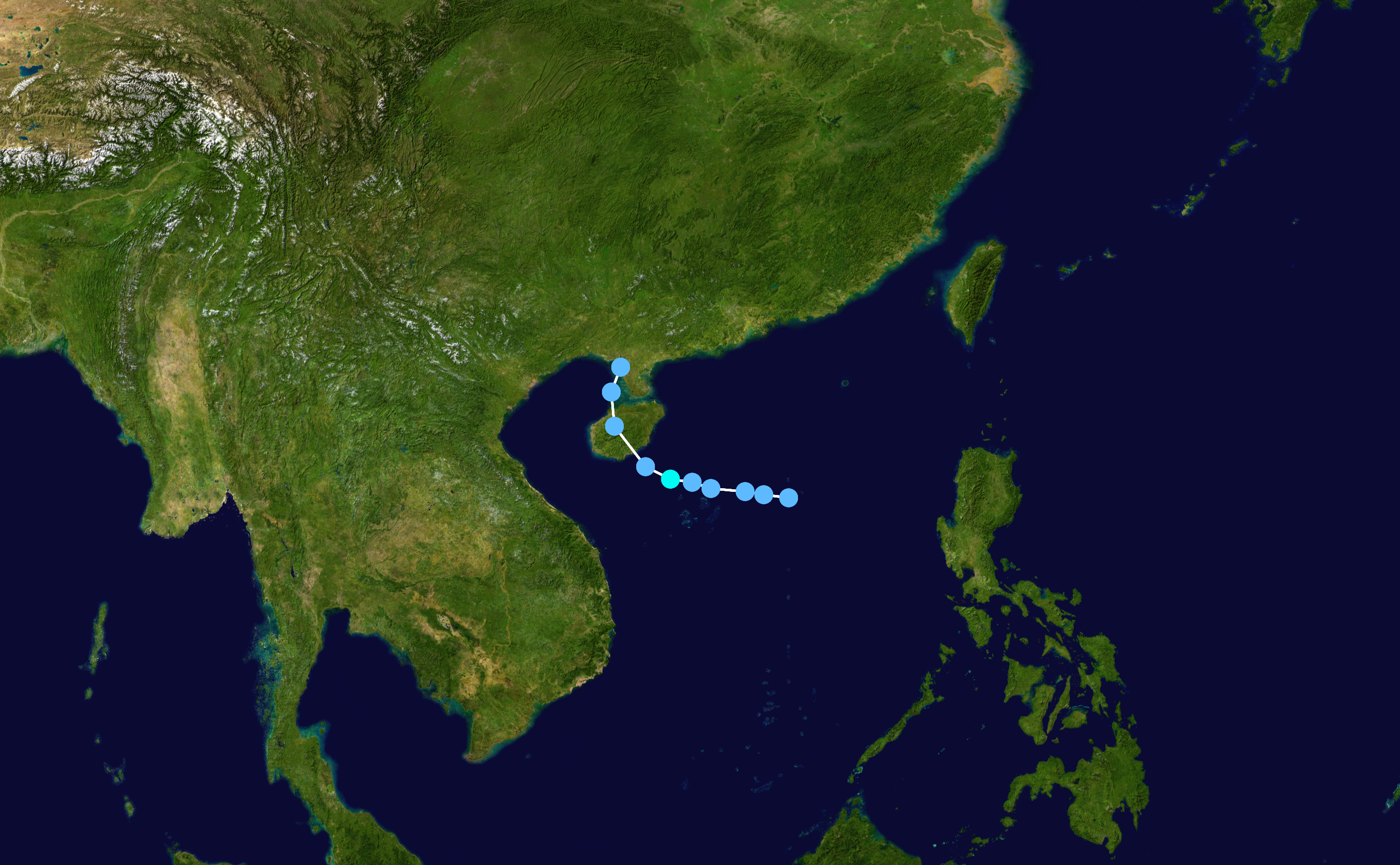
- Duration: July 17 – July 19
- Peak intensity: 65 km/h (40 mph) (1-min); 993 hPa (mbar)

The Joint Typhoon Warning Center (JTWC) Best Tracks lists this system as 05W

=== Tropical Storm Faith ===
- Tropical storm (SSHWS)
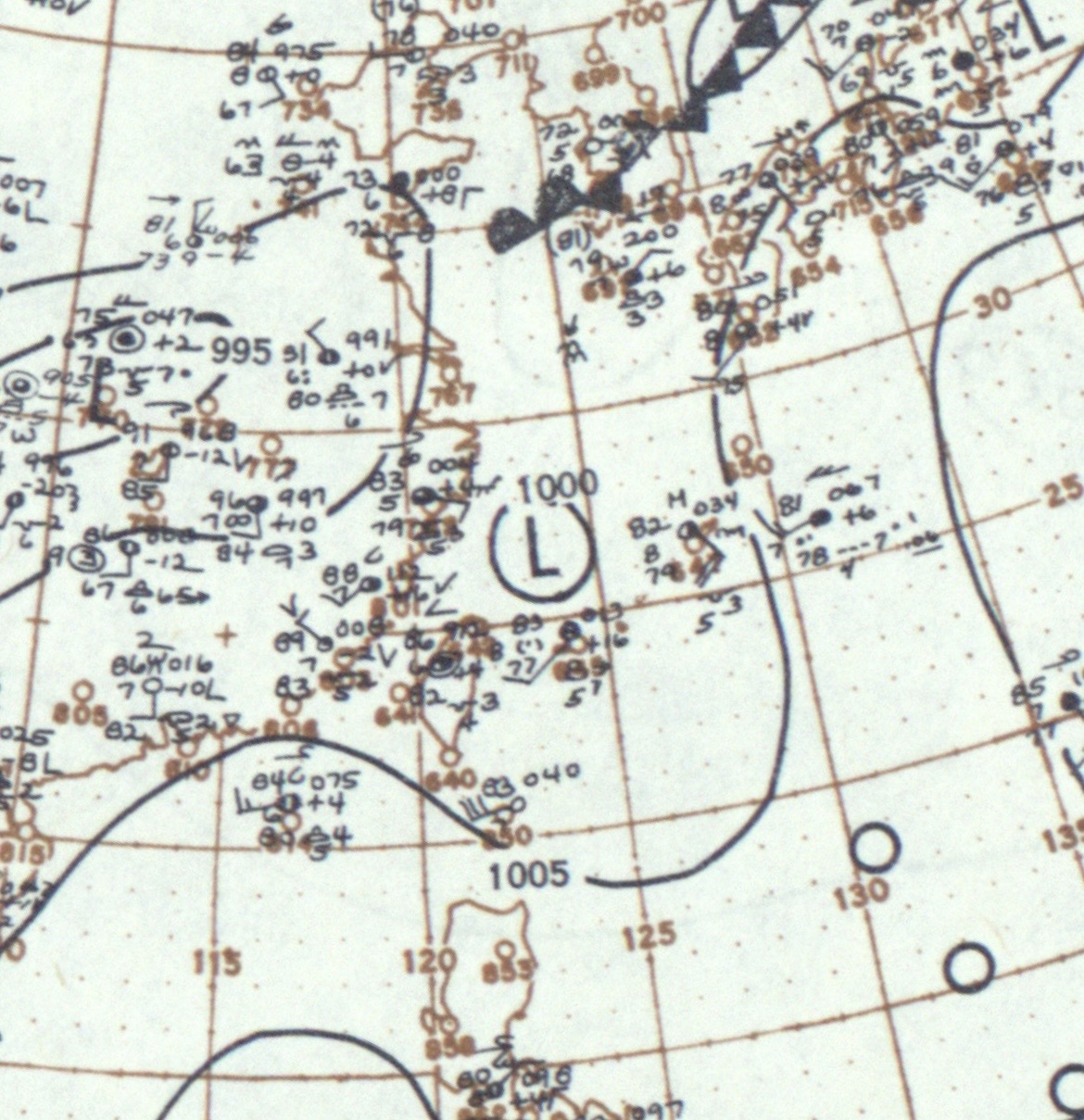
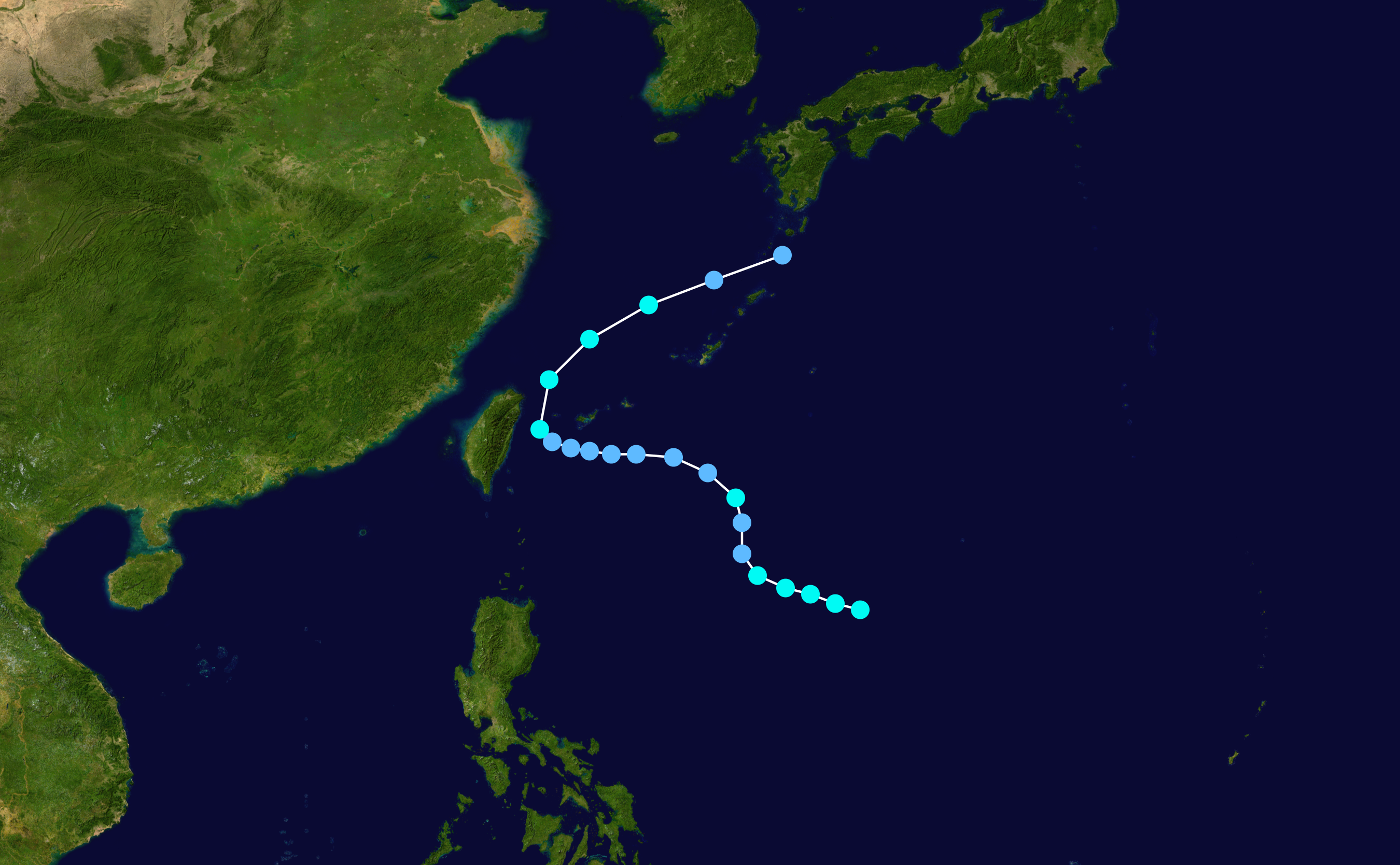
- Duration: July 26 – July 31
- Peak intensity: 95 km/h (60 mph) (1-min); 998 hPa (mbar)

Faith was a tropical storm that existed from July 26 to July 31.

=== Typhoon Gwen ===
- Category 3 typhoon (SSHWS)
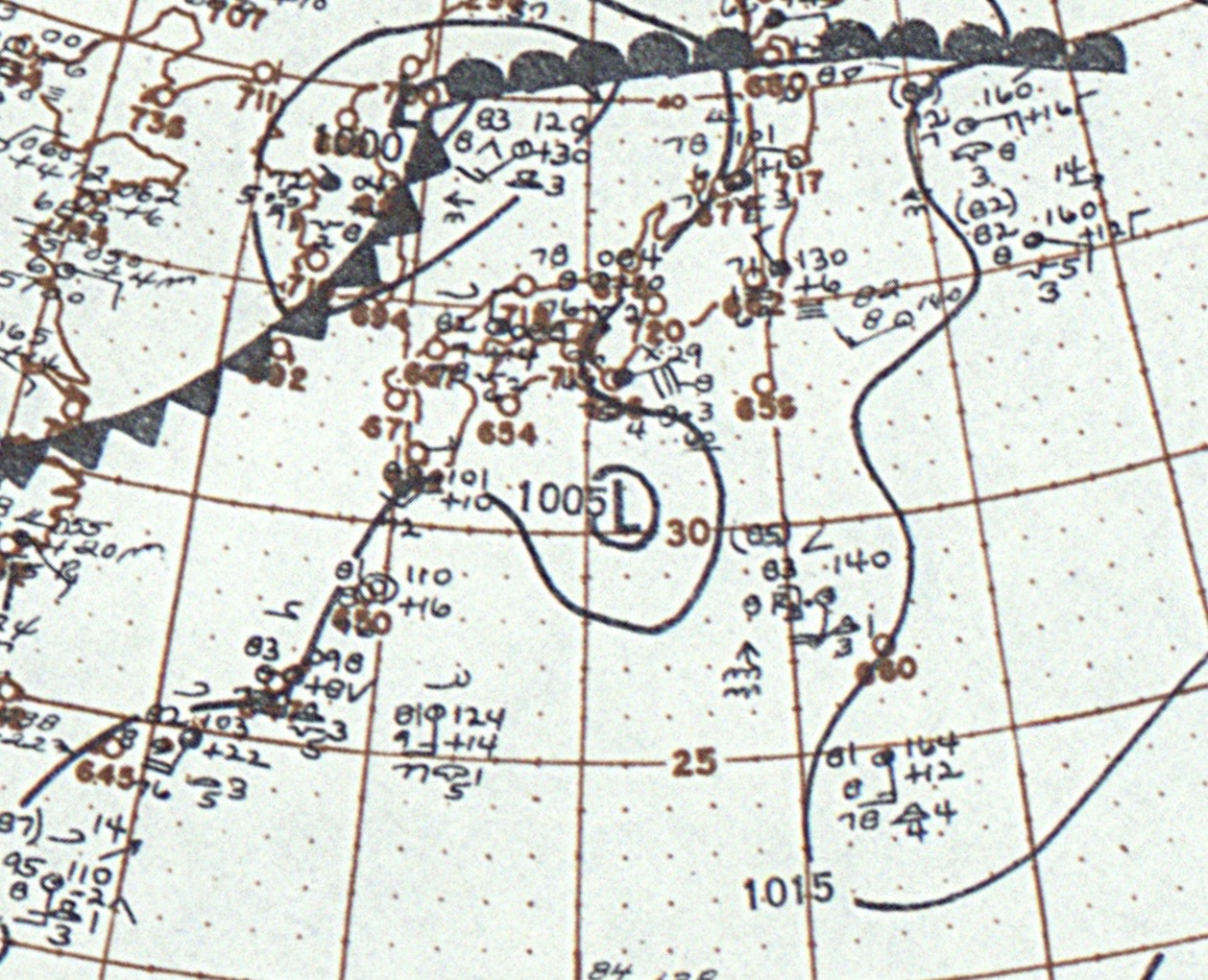
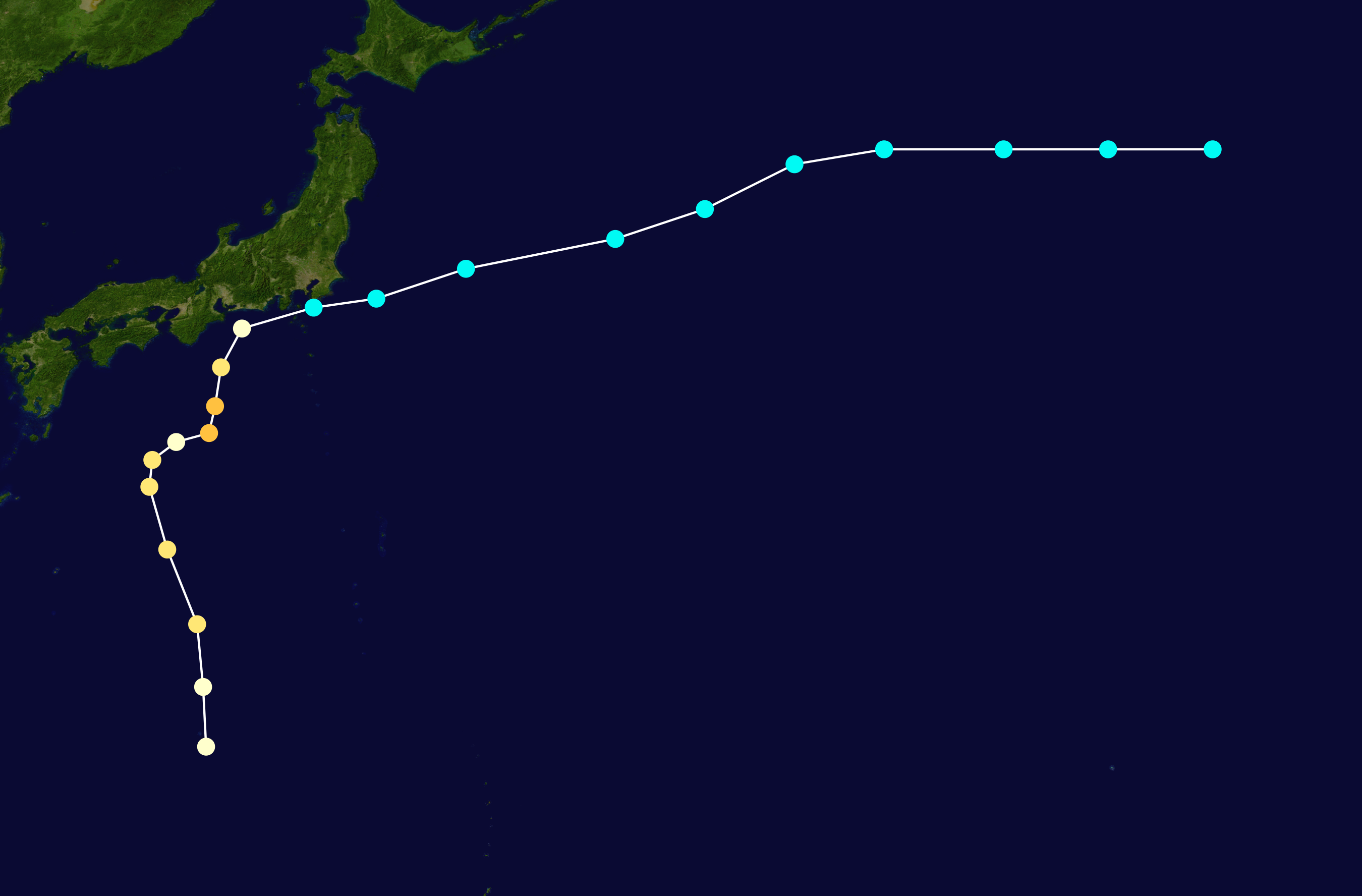
- Duration: August 4 – August 9
- Peak intensity: 185 km/h (115 mph) (1-min); 950 hPa (mbar)

Gwen affected Japan as a Category 3 typhoon.

=== Typhoon Helena ===
- Category 1 typhoon (SSHWS)
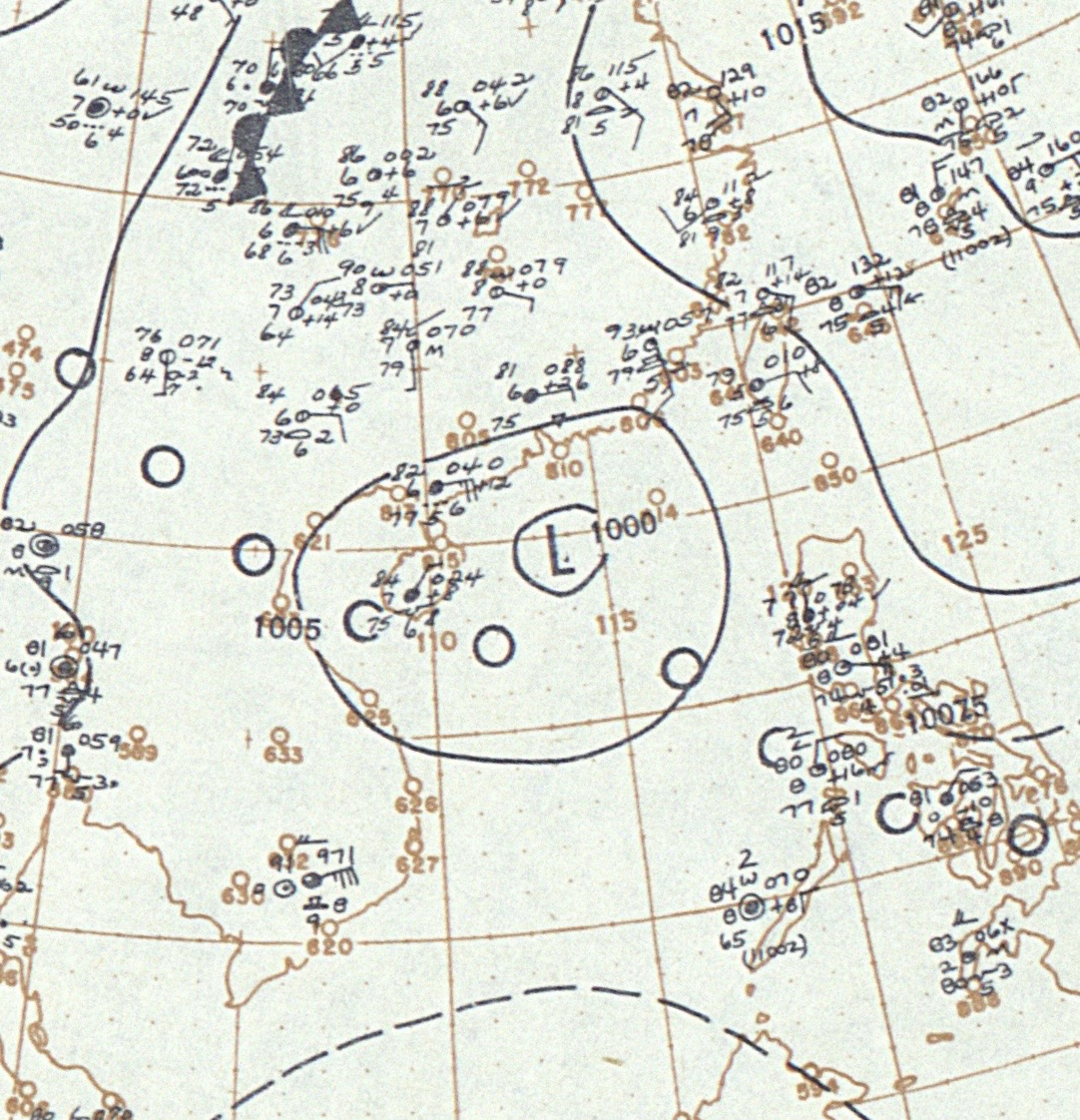
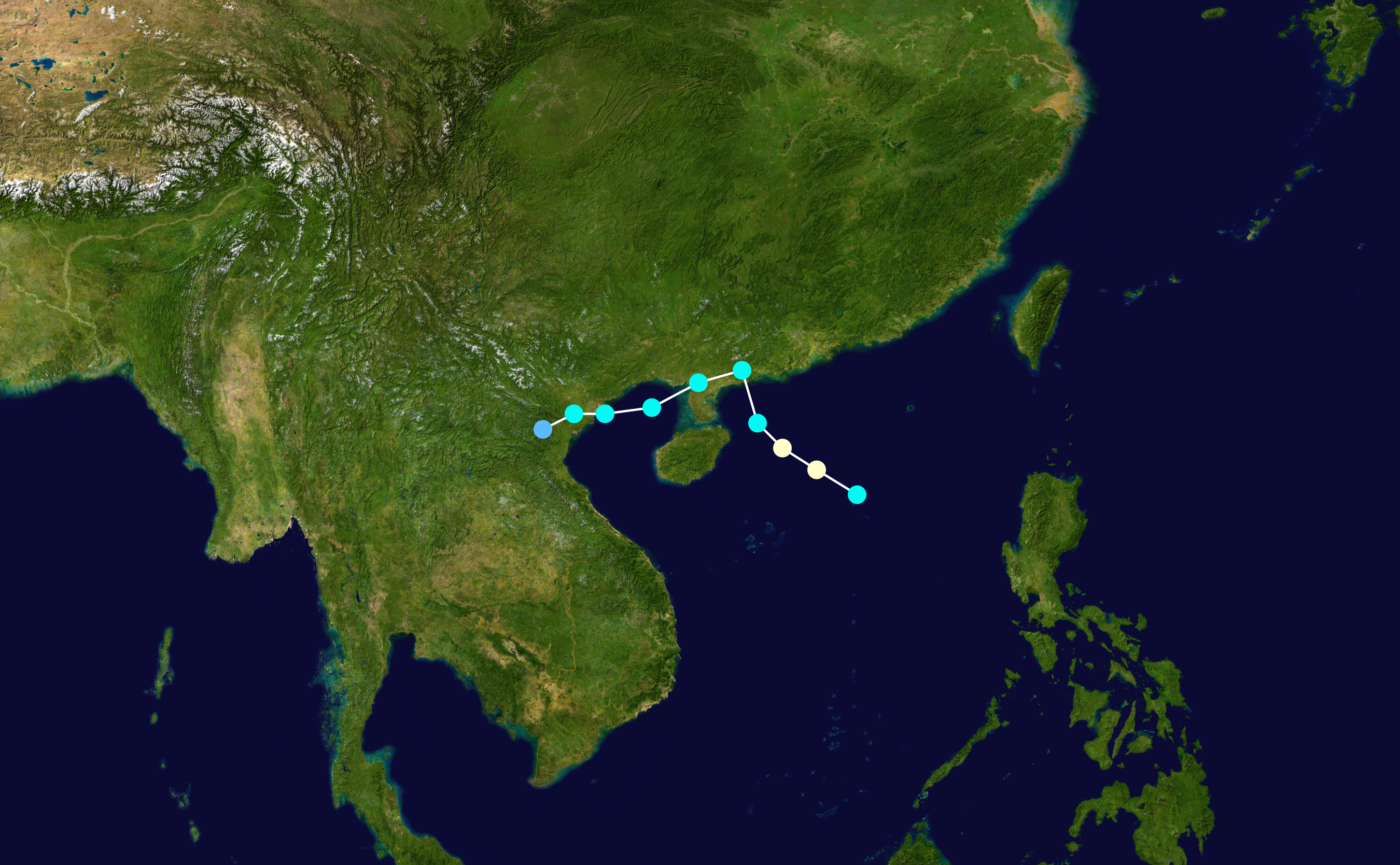
- Duration: August 12 – August 14
- Peak intensity: 130 km/h (80 mph) (1-min); 983 hPa (mbar)

Helena hit China as a tropical storm.

=== Typhoon Inez ===
- Category 3 typhoon (SSHWS)
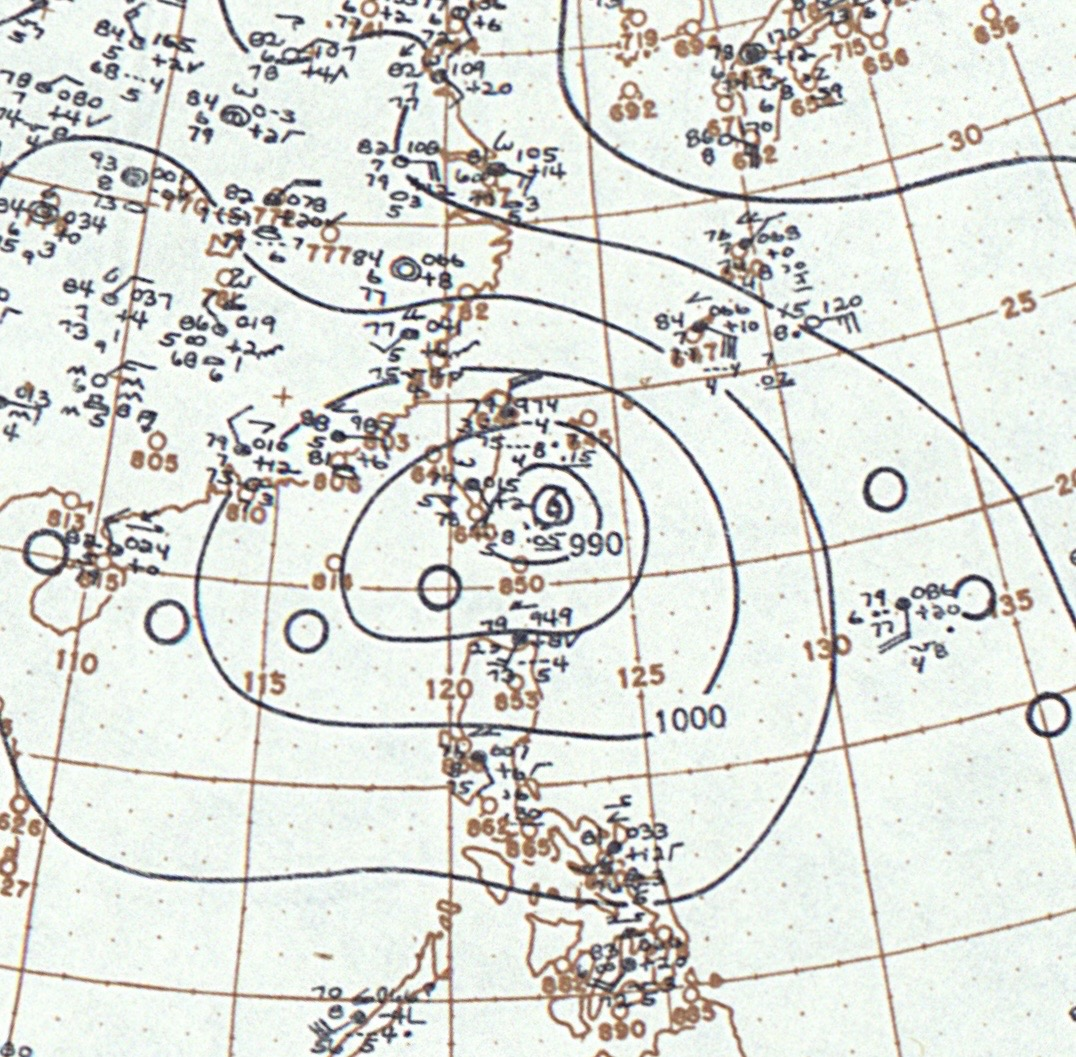
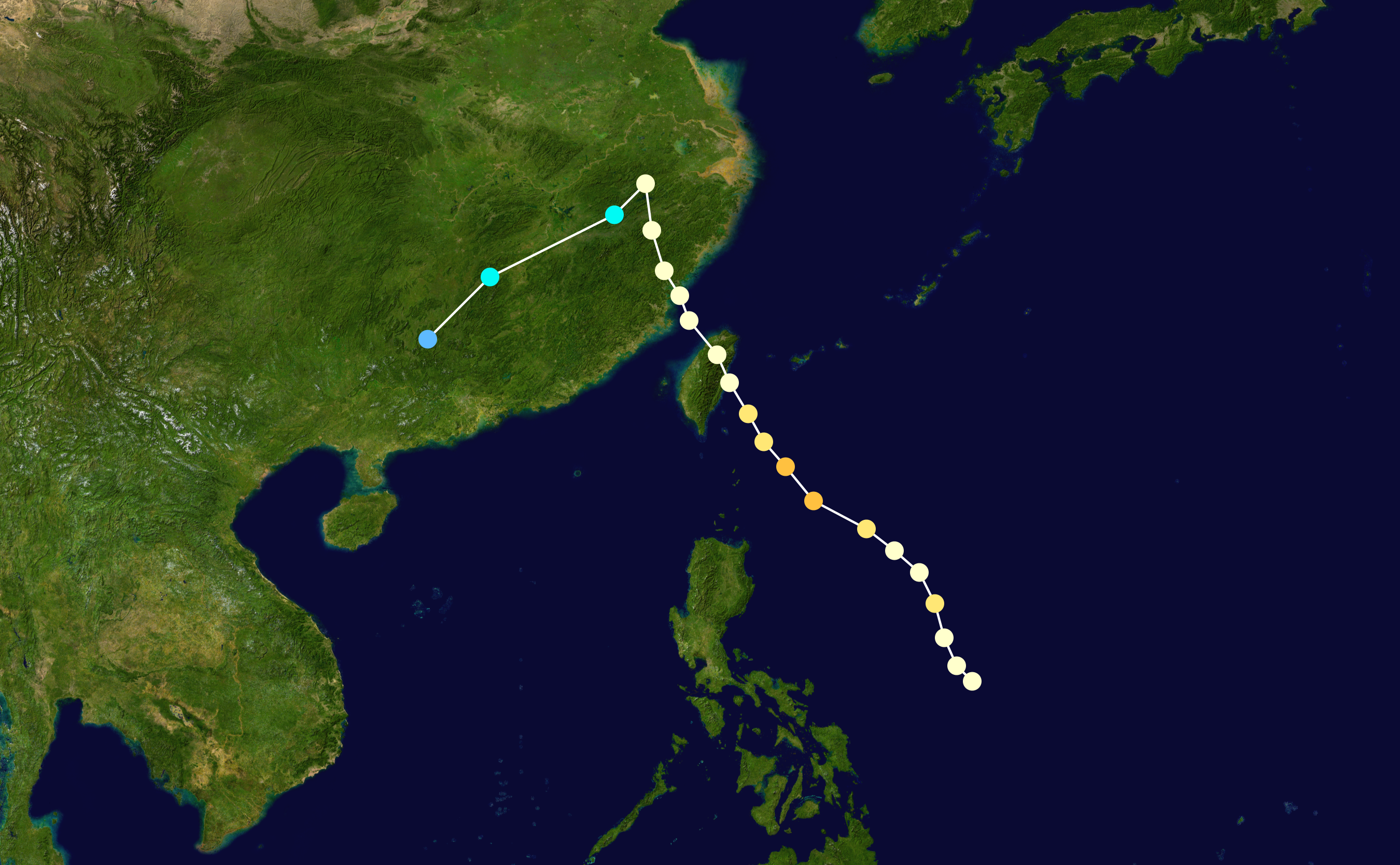
- Duration: August 26 – August 31
- Peak intensity: 185 km/h (115 mph) (1-min); 960 hPa (mbar)

Inez was a category 3 typhoon and hit China as a category 1 typhoon.

=== Tropical Storm Joyce ===
- Tropical storm (SSHWS)
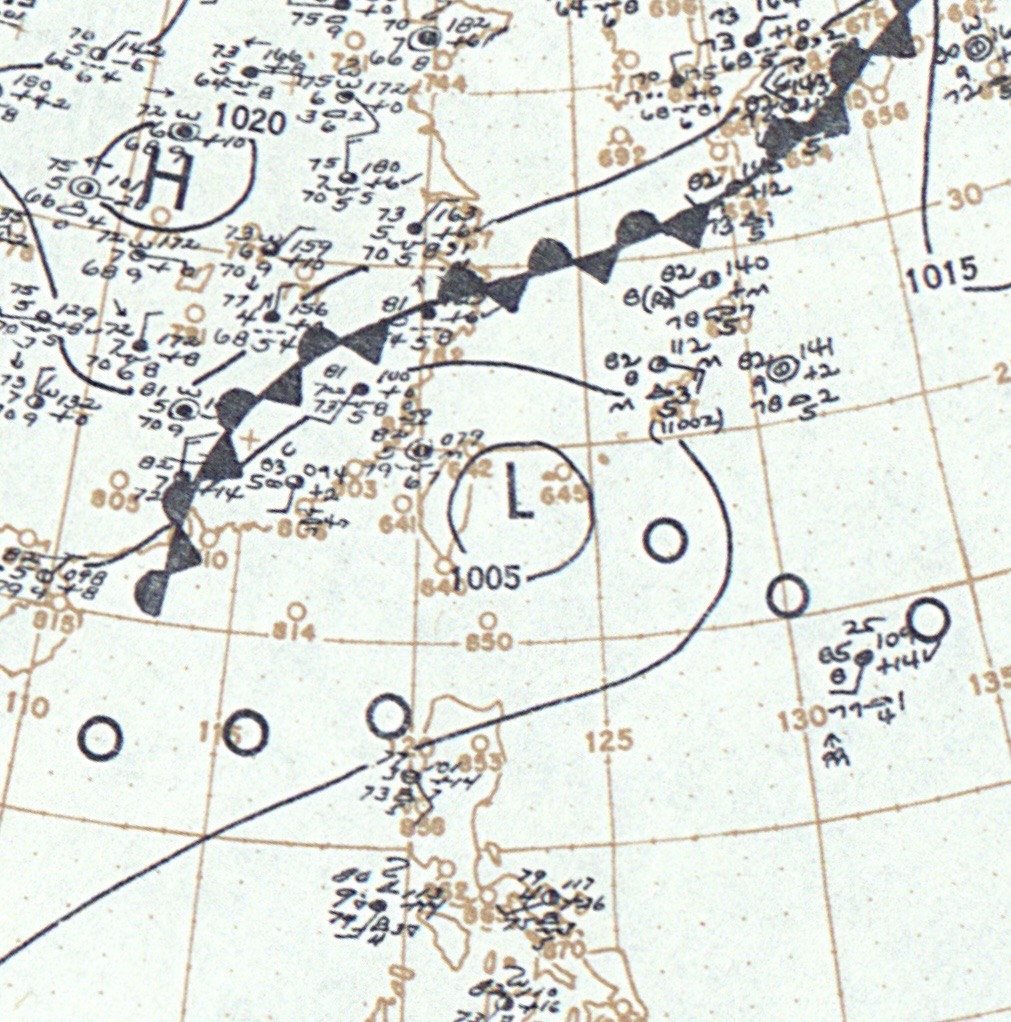
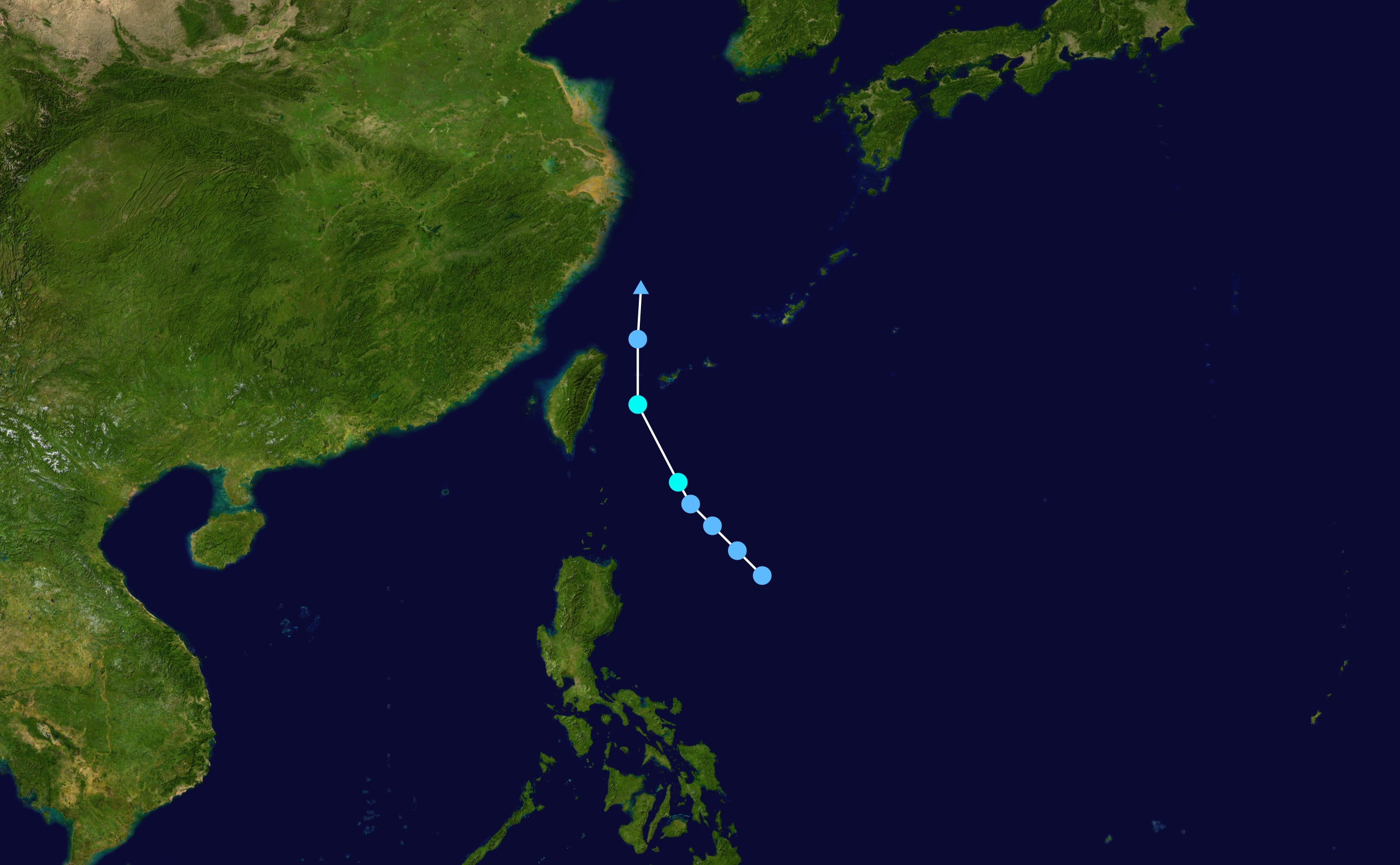
- Duration: September 8 – September 10
- Peak intensity: 65 km/h (40 mph) (1-min); 1000 hPa (mbar)

Joyce was a short lived tropical storm.

=== Typhoon Kathleen ===
- Category 2 typhoon (SSHWS)
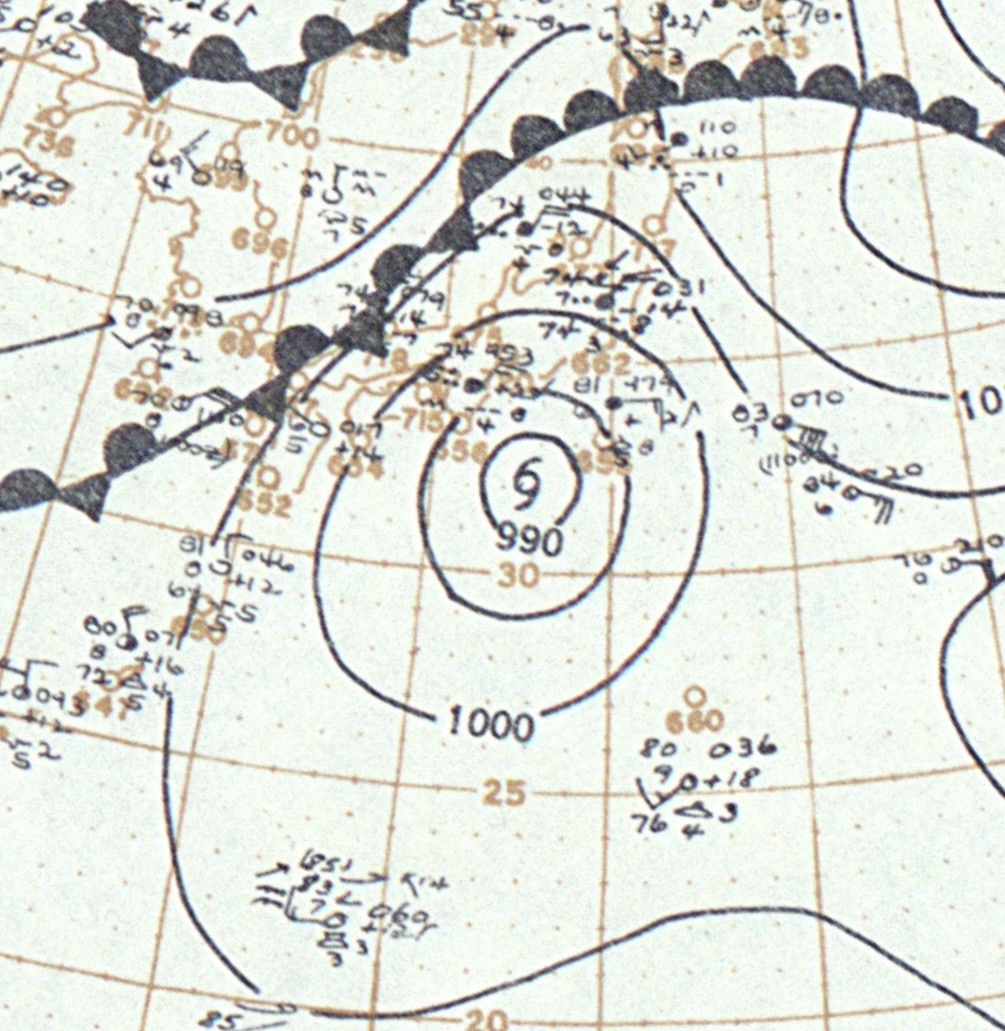
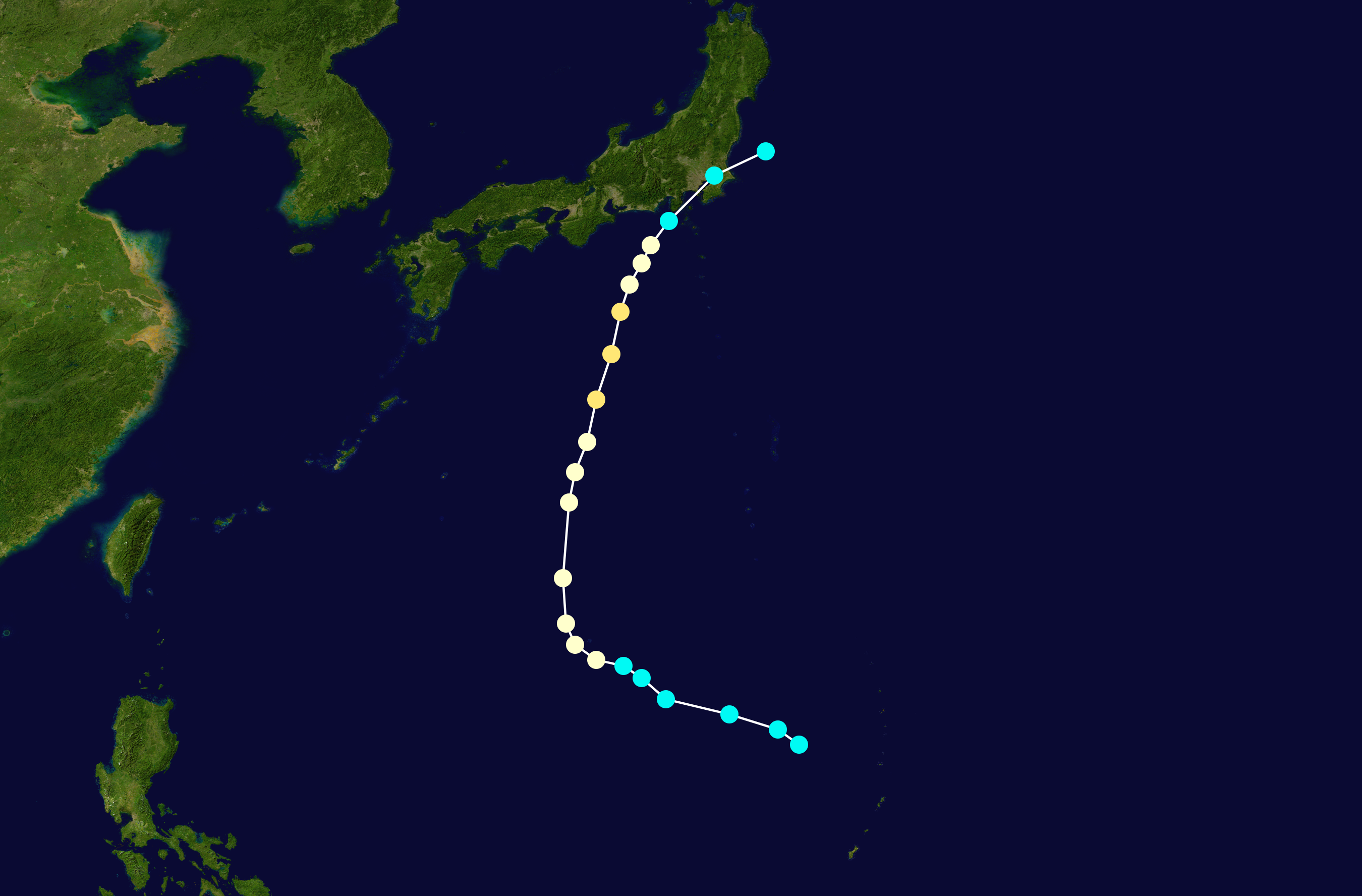
- Duration: September 10 – September 15
- Peak intensity: 165 km/h (105 mph) (1-min); 960 hPa (mbar)

Typhoon Kathleen struck the Boso Peninsula and the entire Kanto Region in Japan on September 15. Heavy rains caused the Arakawa and Tone Rivers to overflow. The resulting floods killed 1,077 people and left 853 people missing.

=== Typhoon Laura ===
- Category 2 typhoon (SSHWS)
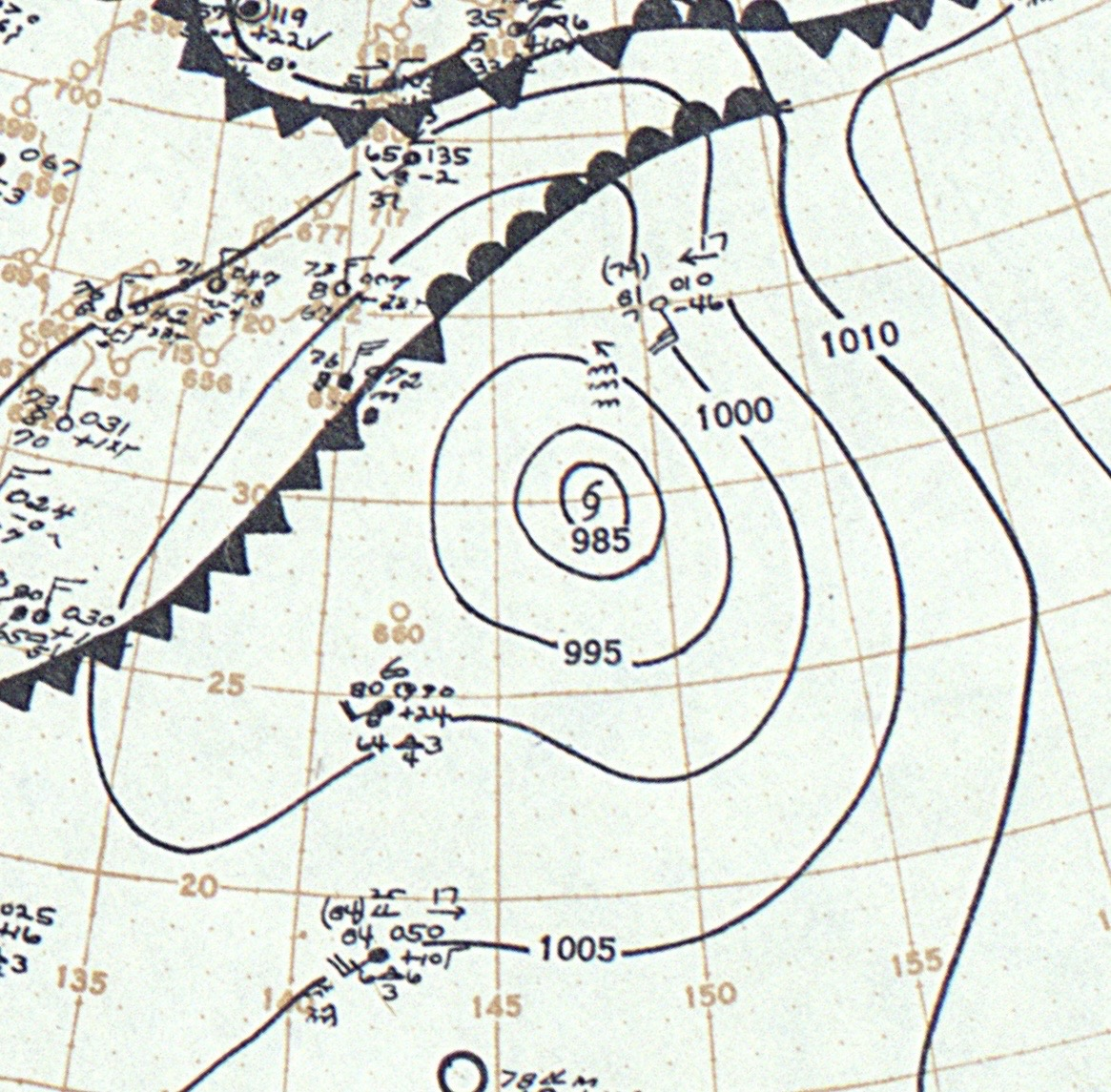
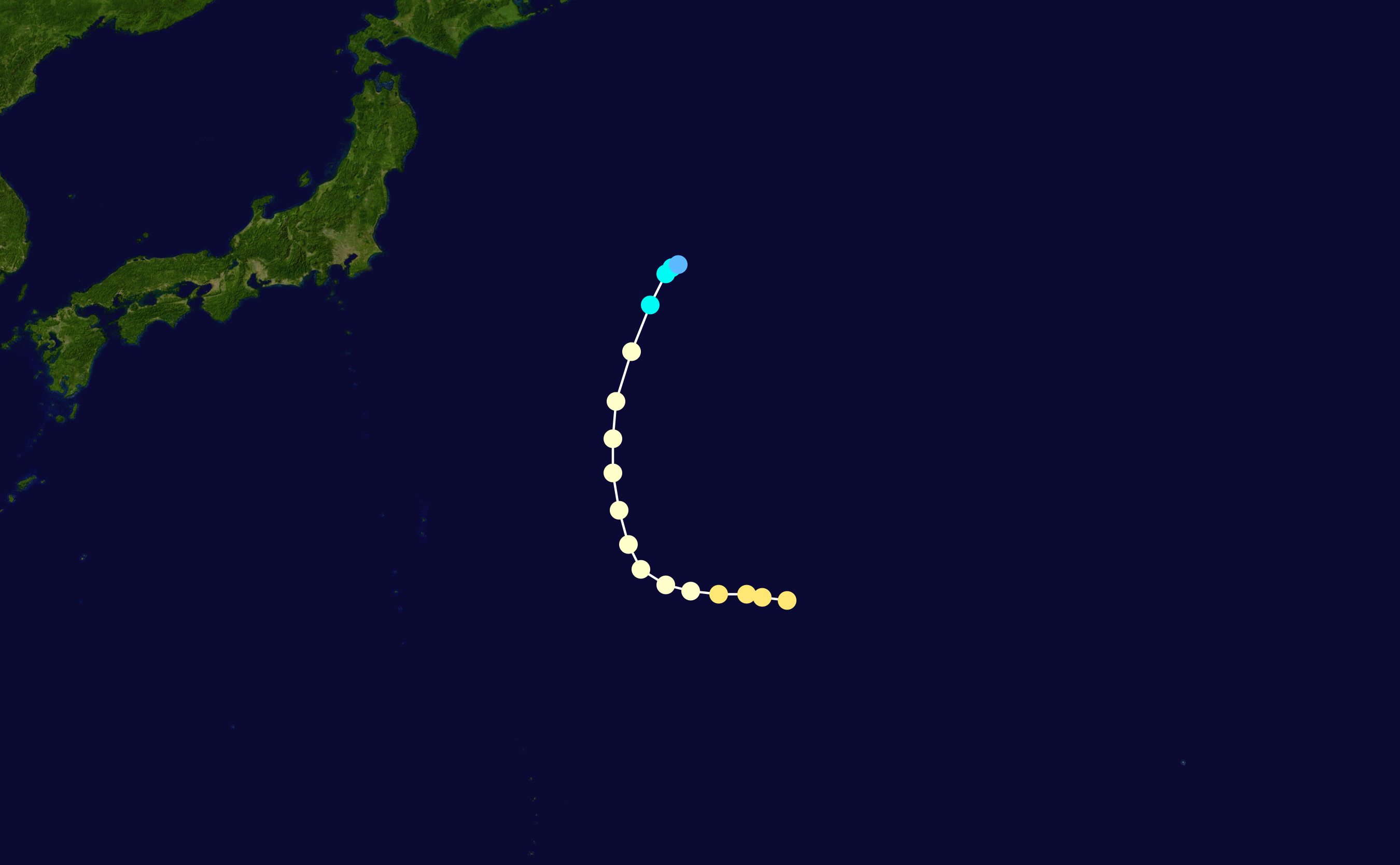
- Duration: September 14 – September 18
- Peak intensity: 165 km/h (105 mph) (1-min); 962 hPa (mbar)

=== Typhoon Mildred ===
- Category 1 typhoon (SSHWS)
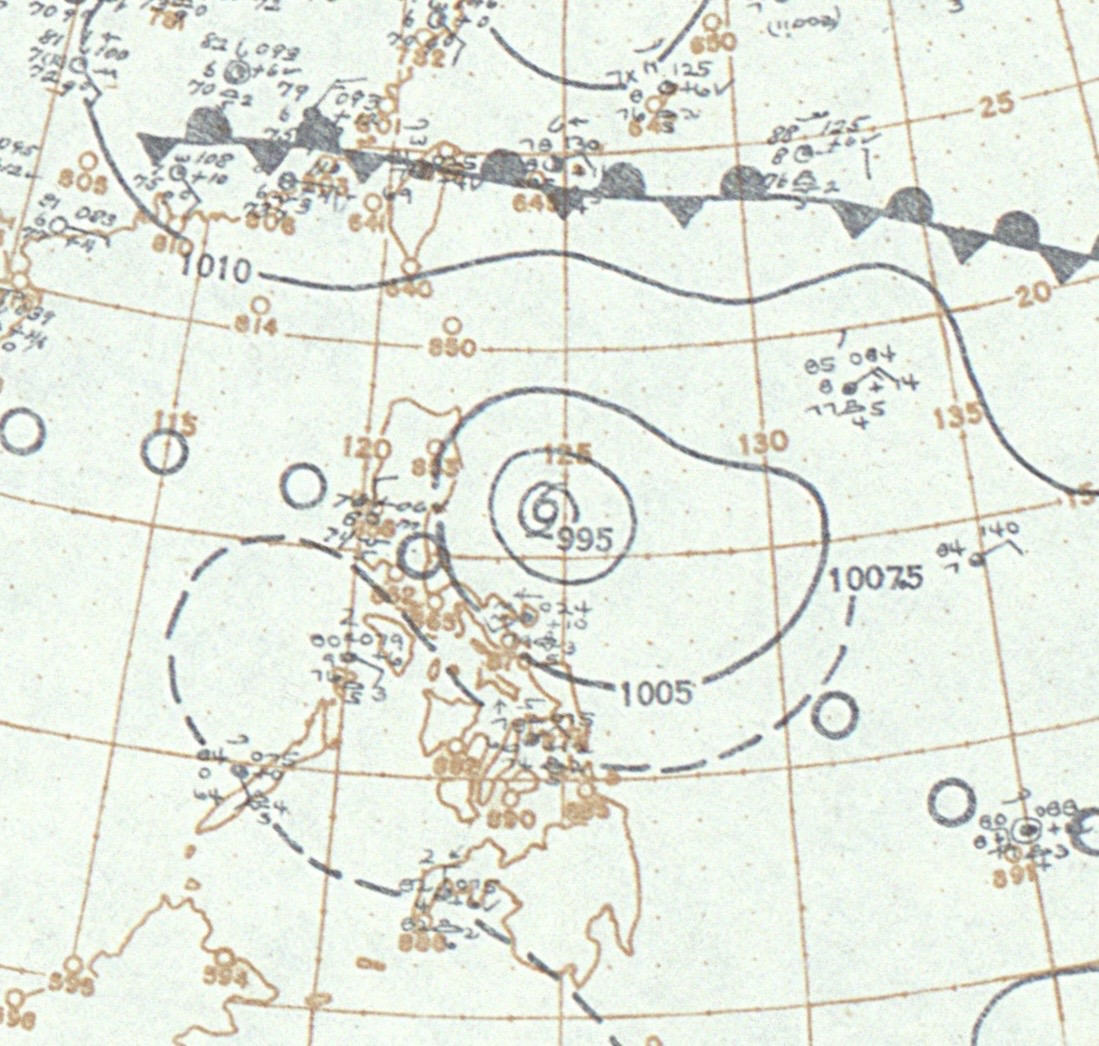
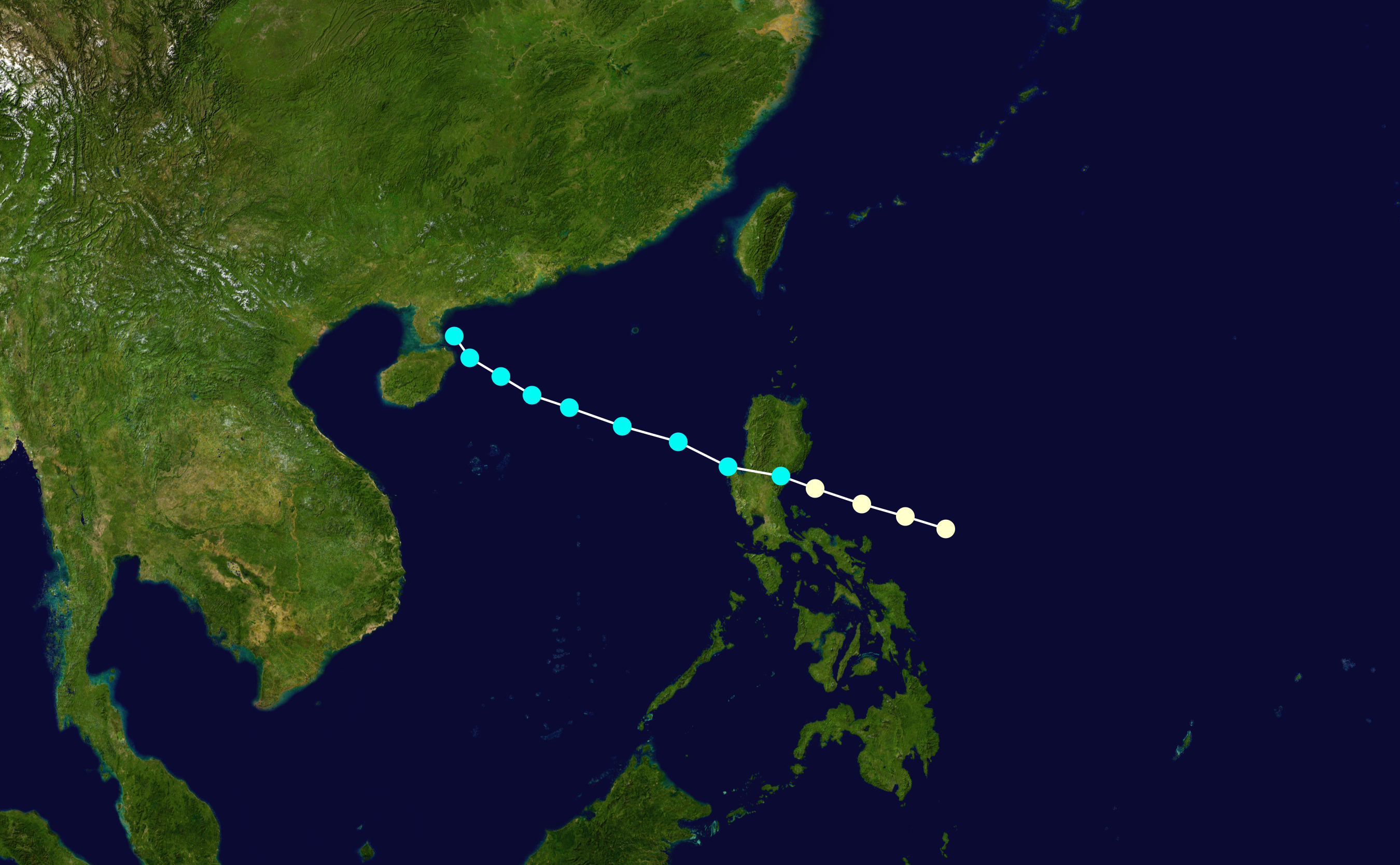
- Duration: September 22 – September 25
- Peak intensity: 140 km/h (85 mph) (1-min); 985 hPa (mbar)

Typhoon Mildred made landfall in Central Luzon as a minimal typhoon. It then crossed the South China Sea en route to Hainan Island, where the system lost its identity.

=== Typhoon Nanette ===
- Category 2 typhoon (SSHWS)
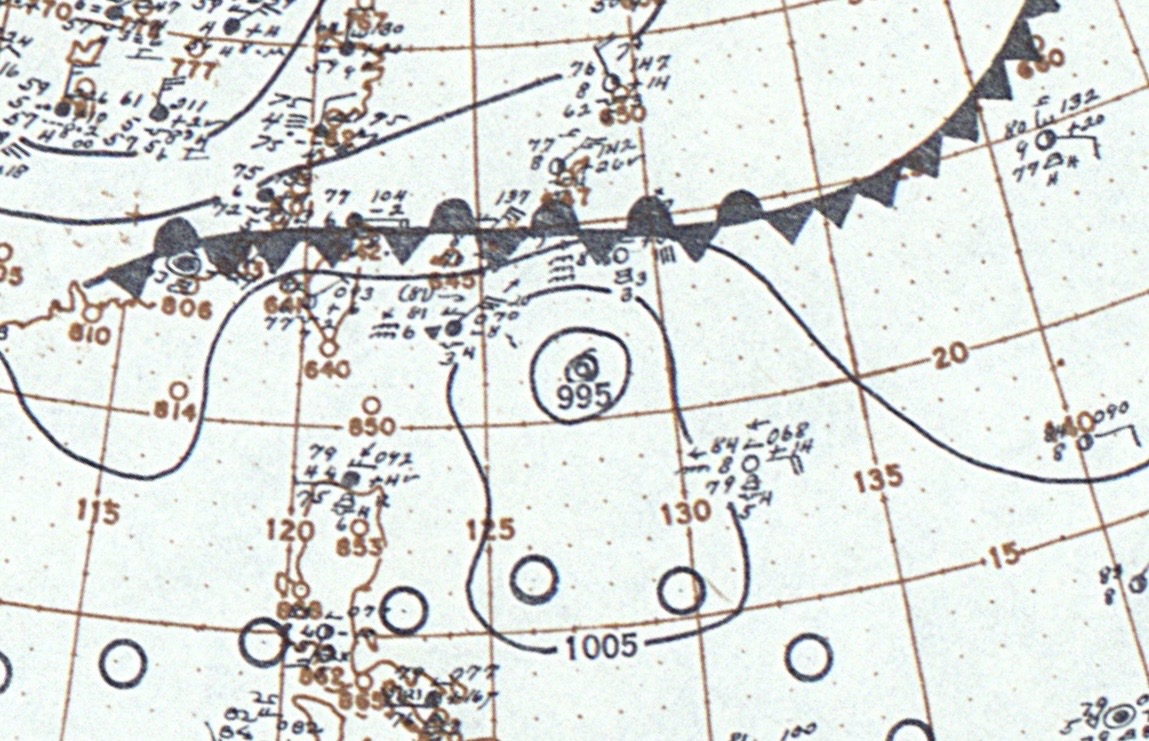
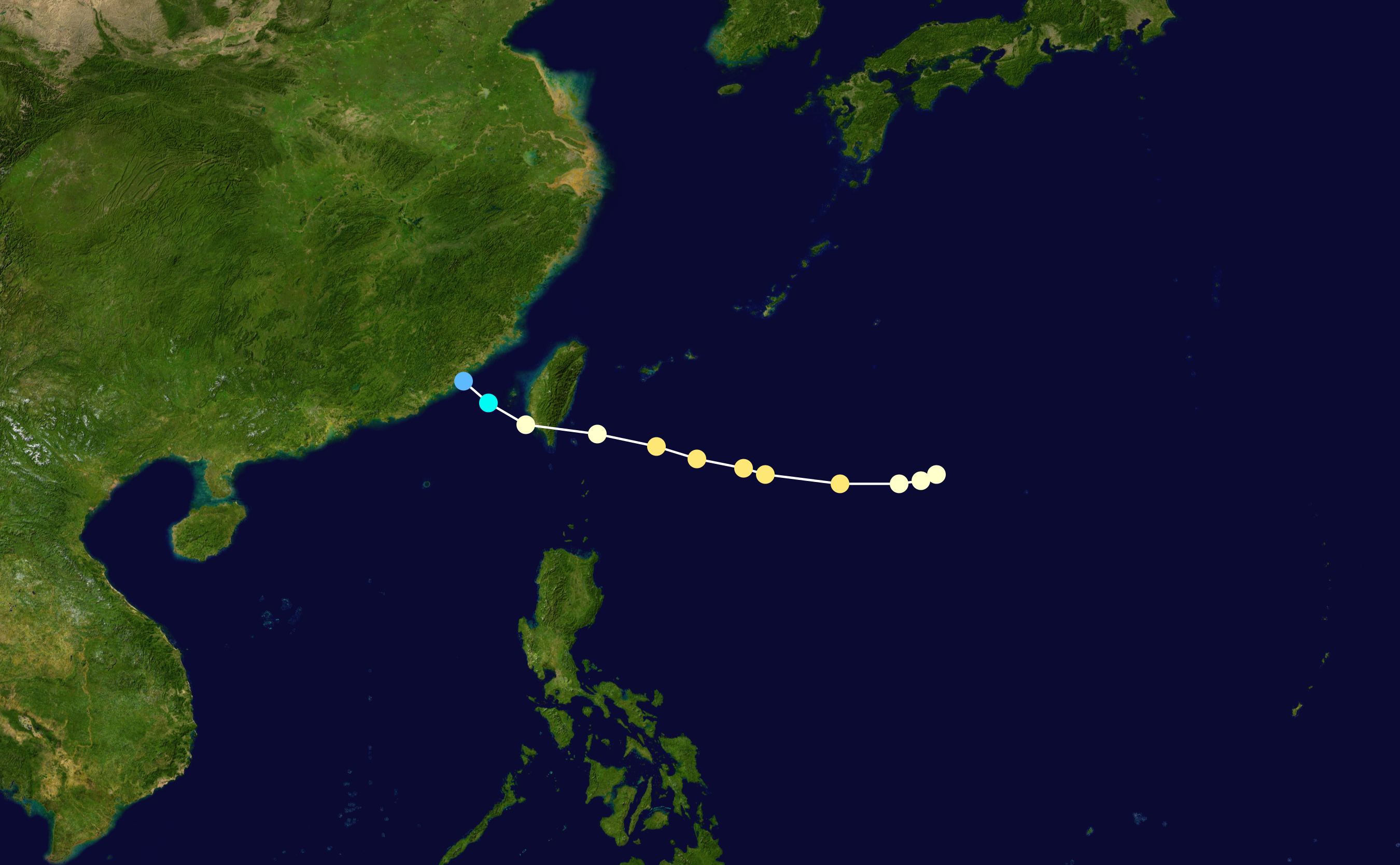
- Duration: September 29 – October 2
- Peak intensity: 165 km/h (105 mph) (1-min); 970 hPa (mbar)

It affected Southern Taiwan.

=== Typhoon Olive ===
- Category 3 typhoon (SSHWS)
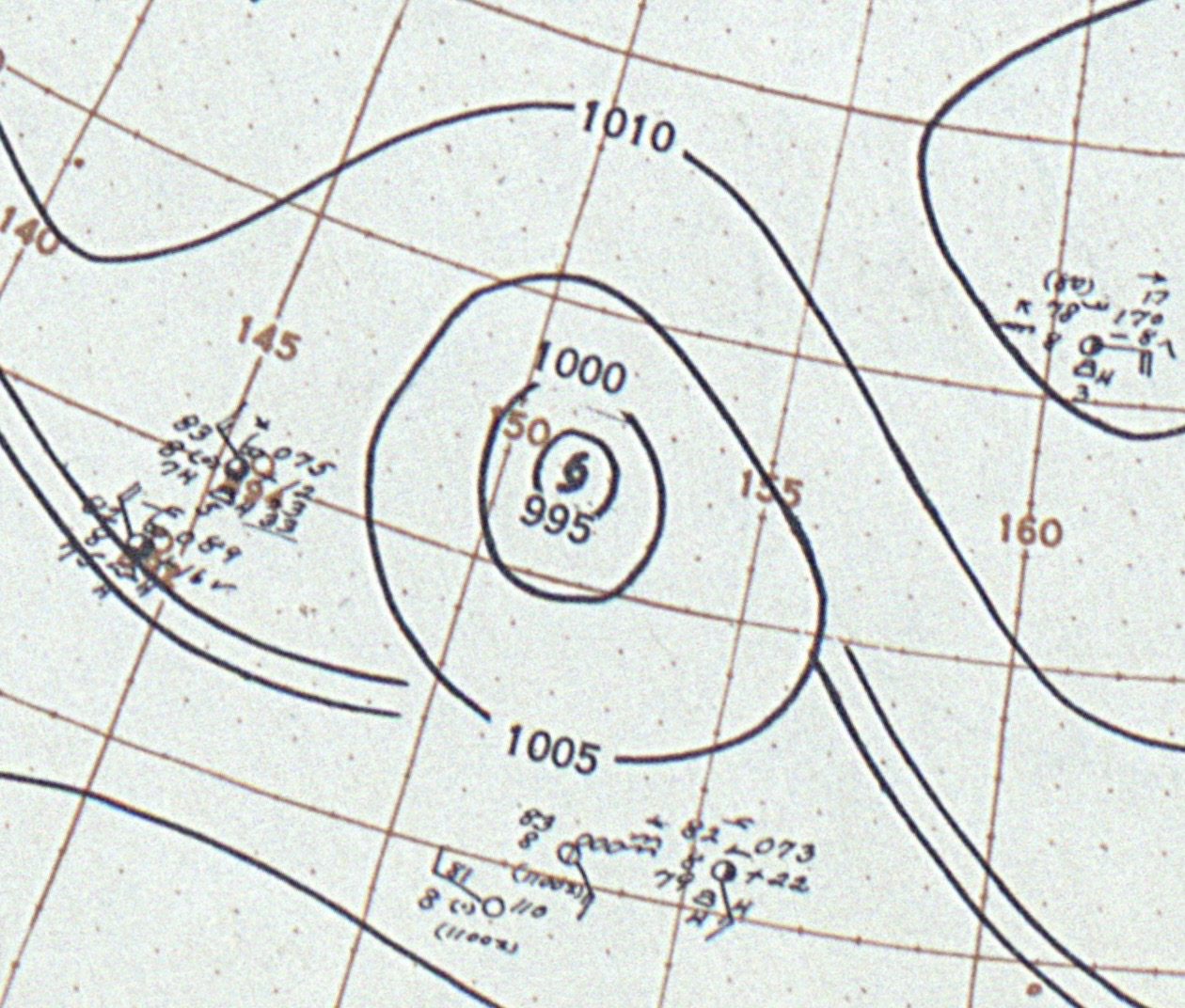
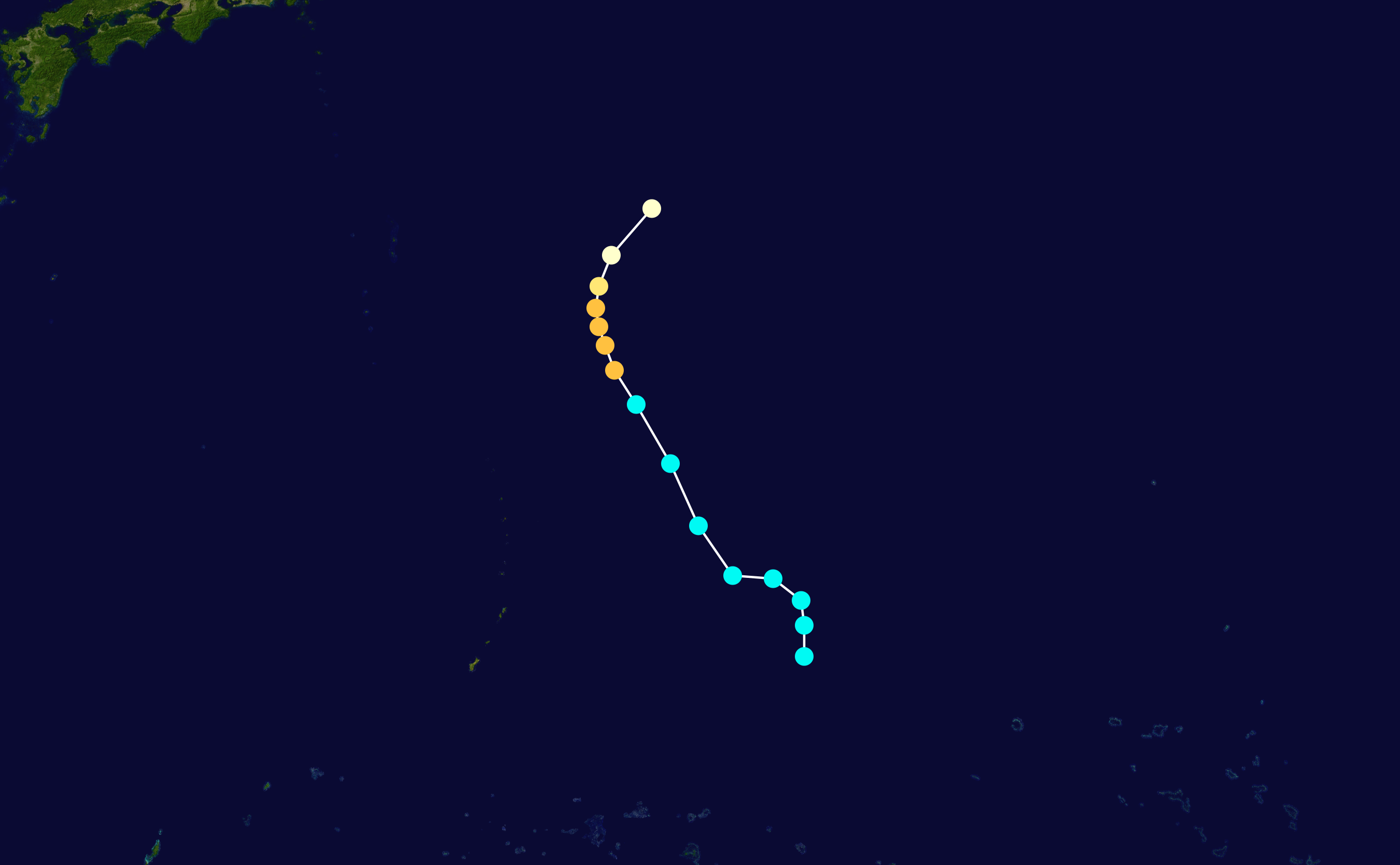
- Duration: October 2 – October 5
- Peak intensity: 205 km/h (125 mph) (1-min); 958 hPa (mbar)

Olive was a category 3 typhoon that stayed out at sea.

=== Typhoon Pauline ===
- Category 3 typhoon (SSHWS)
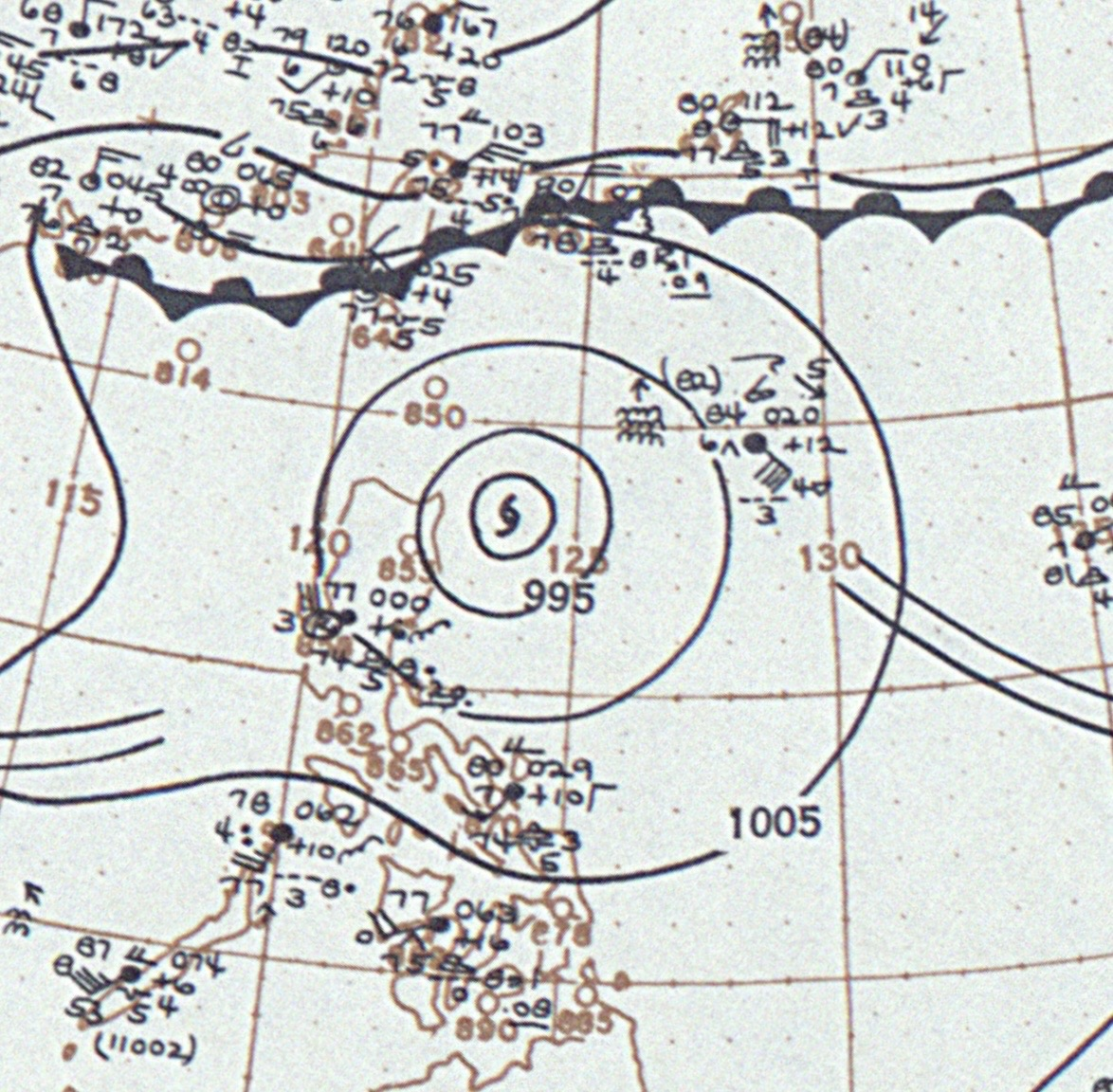
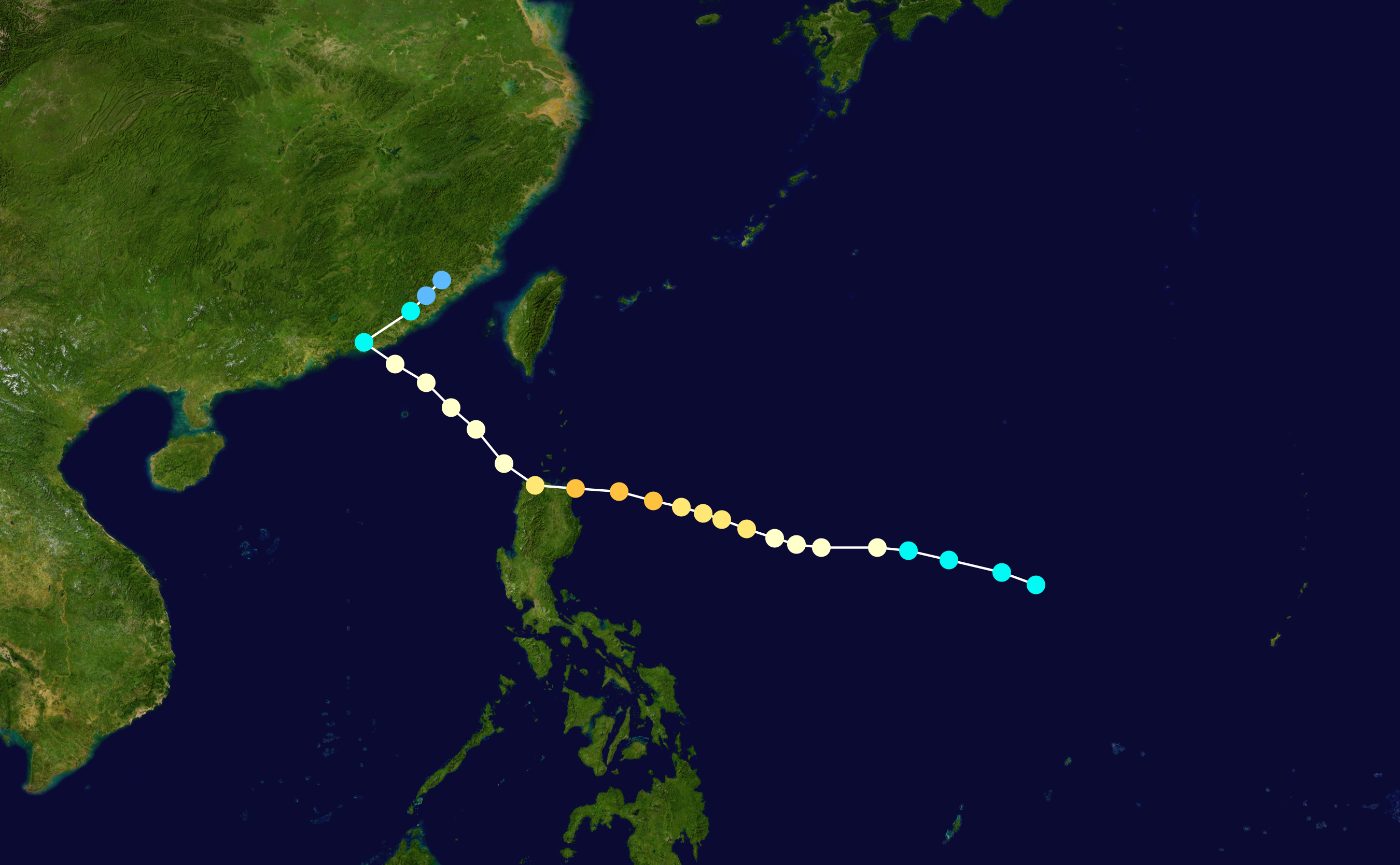
- Duration: October 2 – October 8
- Peak intensity: 185 km/h (115 mph) (1-min); 958 hPa (mbar)

Typhoon Pauline made landfall over northeastern Cagayan province as a moderately strong typhoon.

=== Super Typhoon Rosalind ===
- Category 4 super typhoon (SSHWS)
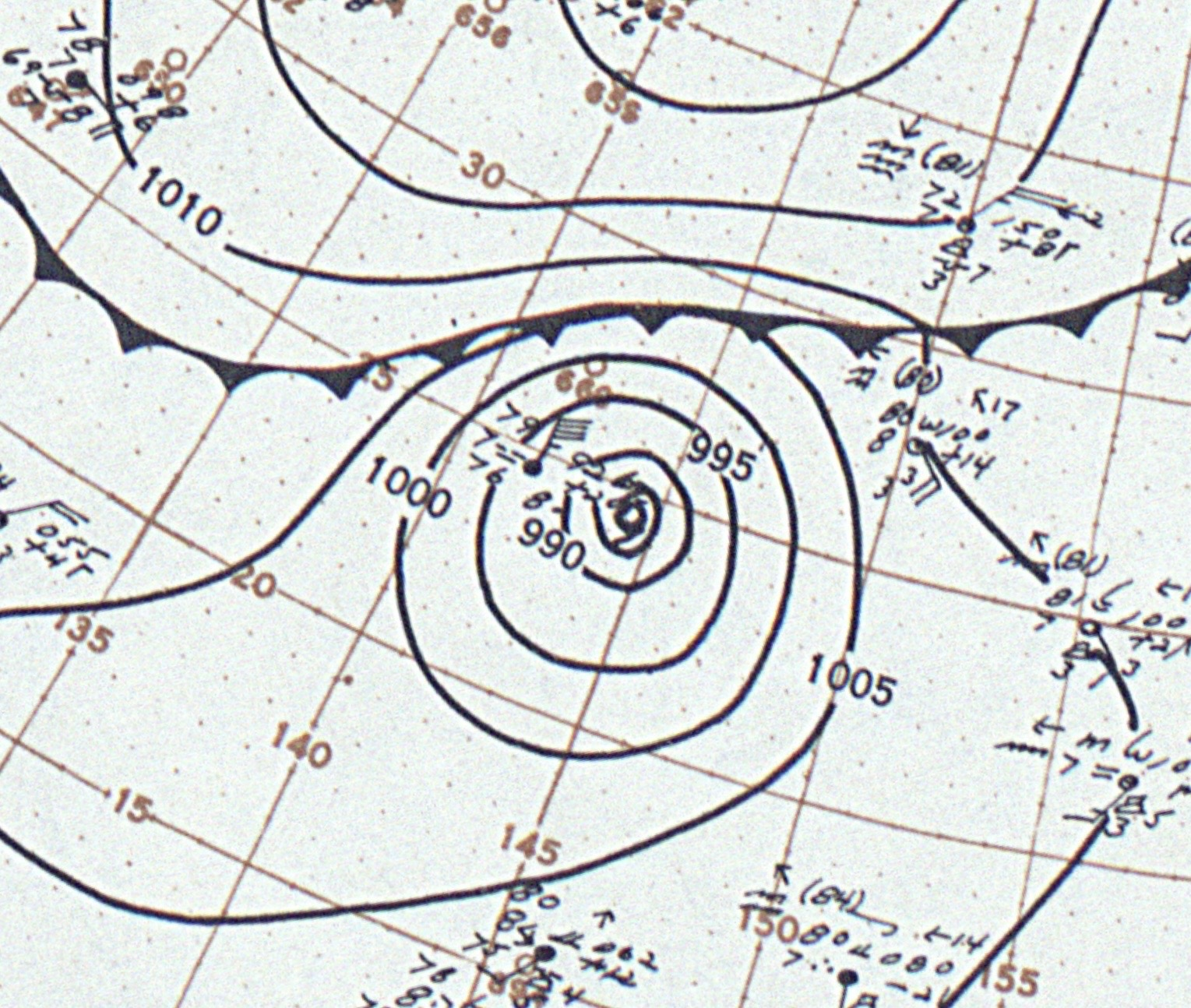
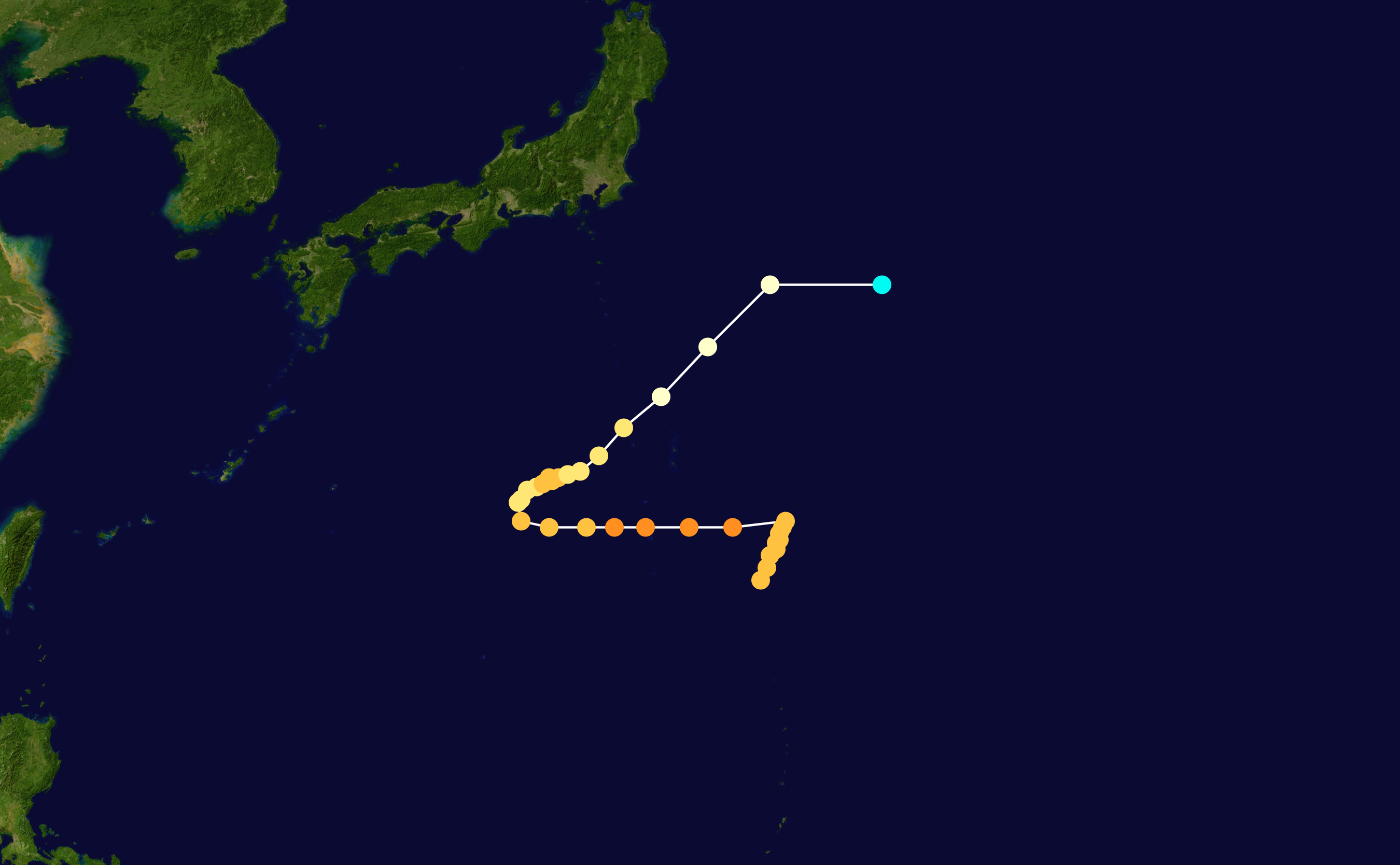
- Duration: October 6 – October 14
- Peak intensity: 240 km/h (150 mph) (1-min); 918 hPa (mbar)

The origins of Rosalind can be traced to a tropical storm that intensified into a category 2 on October 6. Rosalind continued to rapidly intensify from 964 to 918 mbar, reaching its peak intensity. After Rosalind reached its peak intensity, slight wind shear caused Rosalind to weaken on a category 2 on October 10. It intensified into a category 3 before it moved slowly. It weakened to a category 1 and tropical storm. Rosalind dissipated on October 14.

Rosalind was the first super typhoon ever recorded in the Pacific Ocean.

=== Typhoon Alice ===
- Category 4 typhoon (SSHWS)
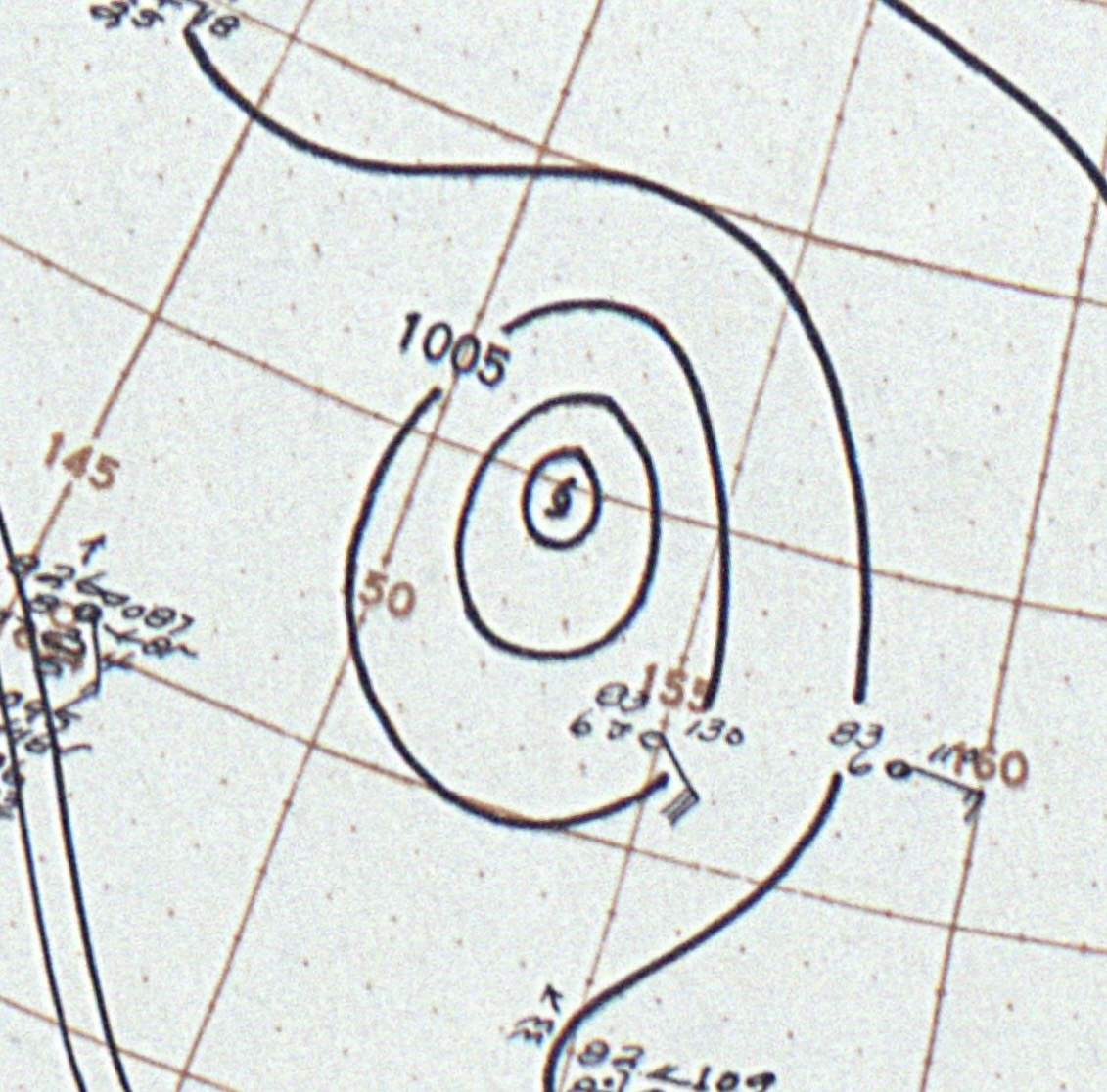
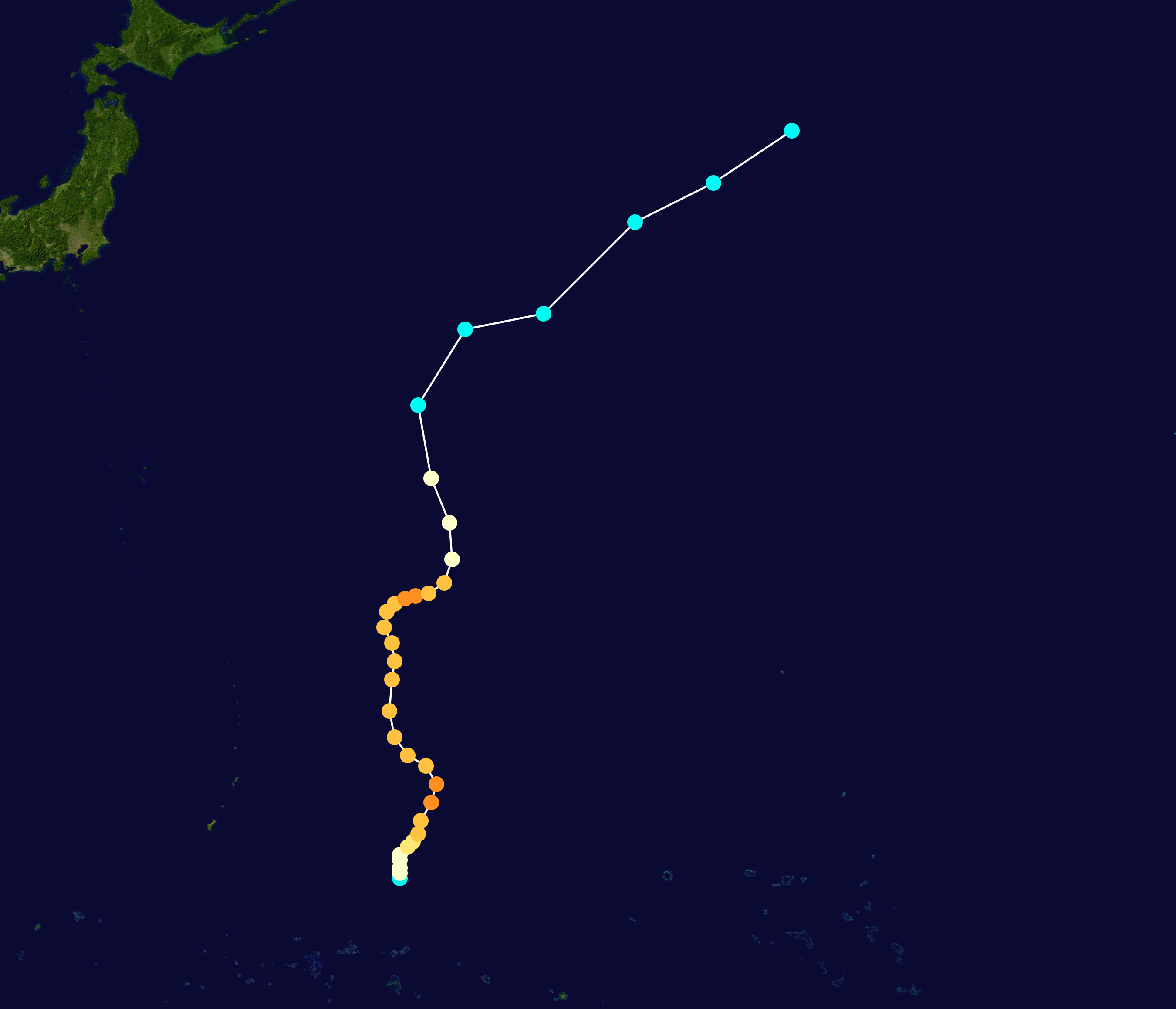
- Duration: October 13 – October 21
- Peak intensity: 220 km/h (140 mph) (1-min); 940 hPa (mbar)

Alice was a category 4 super typhoon that stayed out at sea.

=== Tropical Storm Beatrice ===
- Tropical storm (SSHWS)
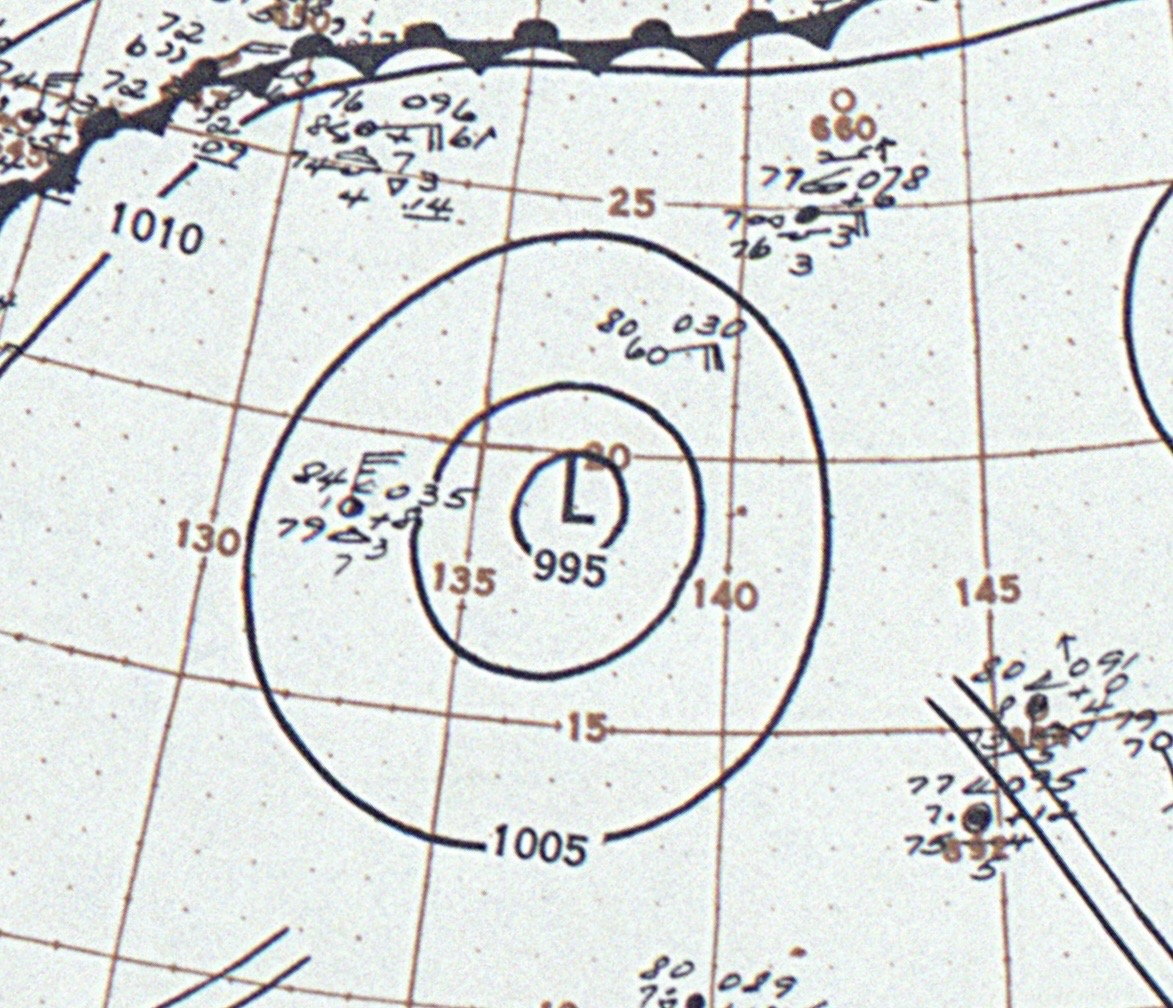
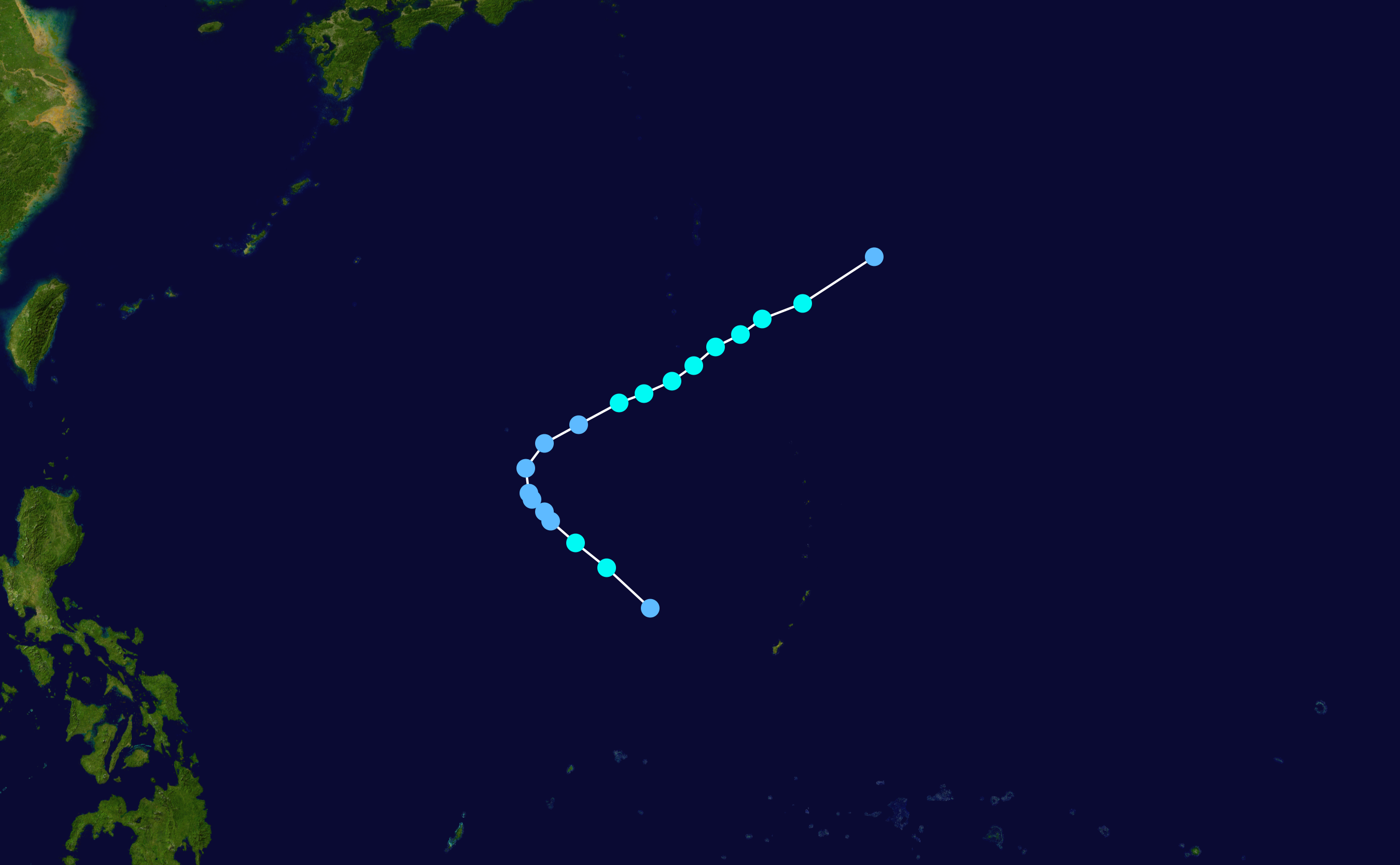
- Duration: October 16 – October 21
- Peak intensity: 85 km/h (50 mph) (1-min); 991 hPa (mbar)

Beatrice was a weak and short-lived tropical storm that stayed out at sea.

=== Typhoon Cathy ===
- Category 3 typhoon (SSHWS)
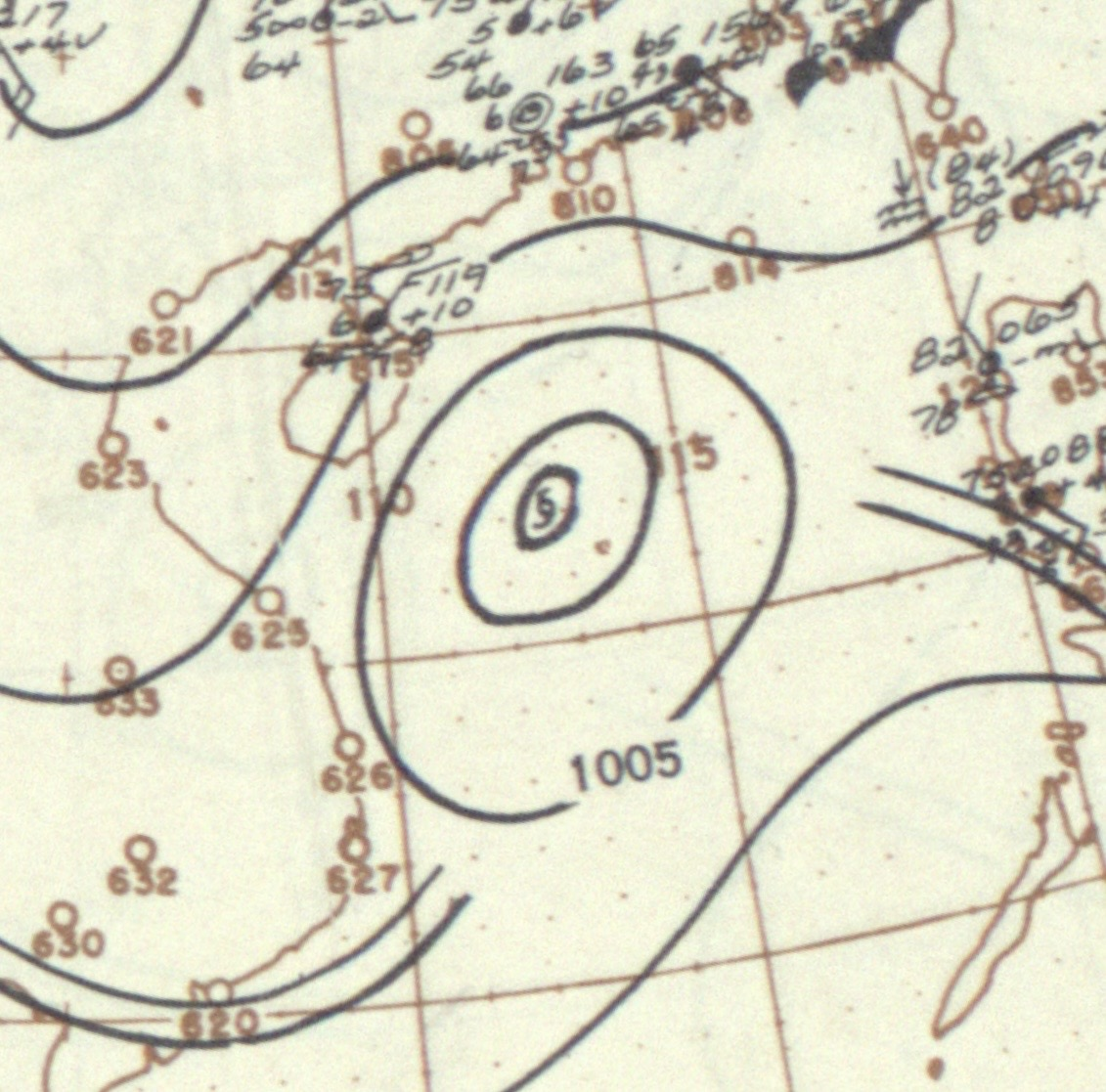
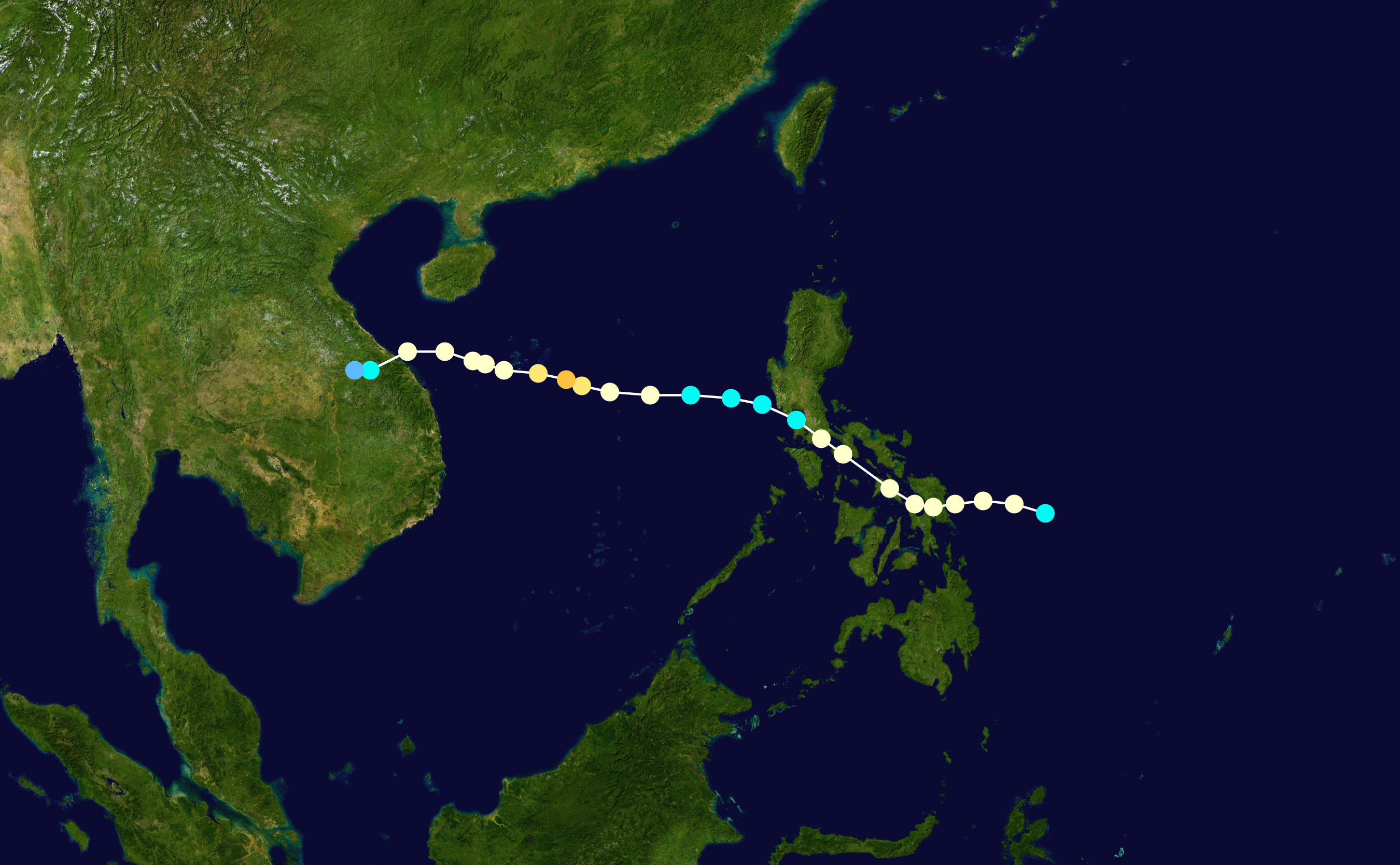
- Duration: October 29 – November 4
- Peak intensity: 185 km/h (115 mph) (1-min); 965 hPa (mbar)

Cathy hit the Philippines and Vietnam as a category 1 typhoon.

=== Typhoon Dora ===
- Category 3 typhoon (SSHWS)
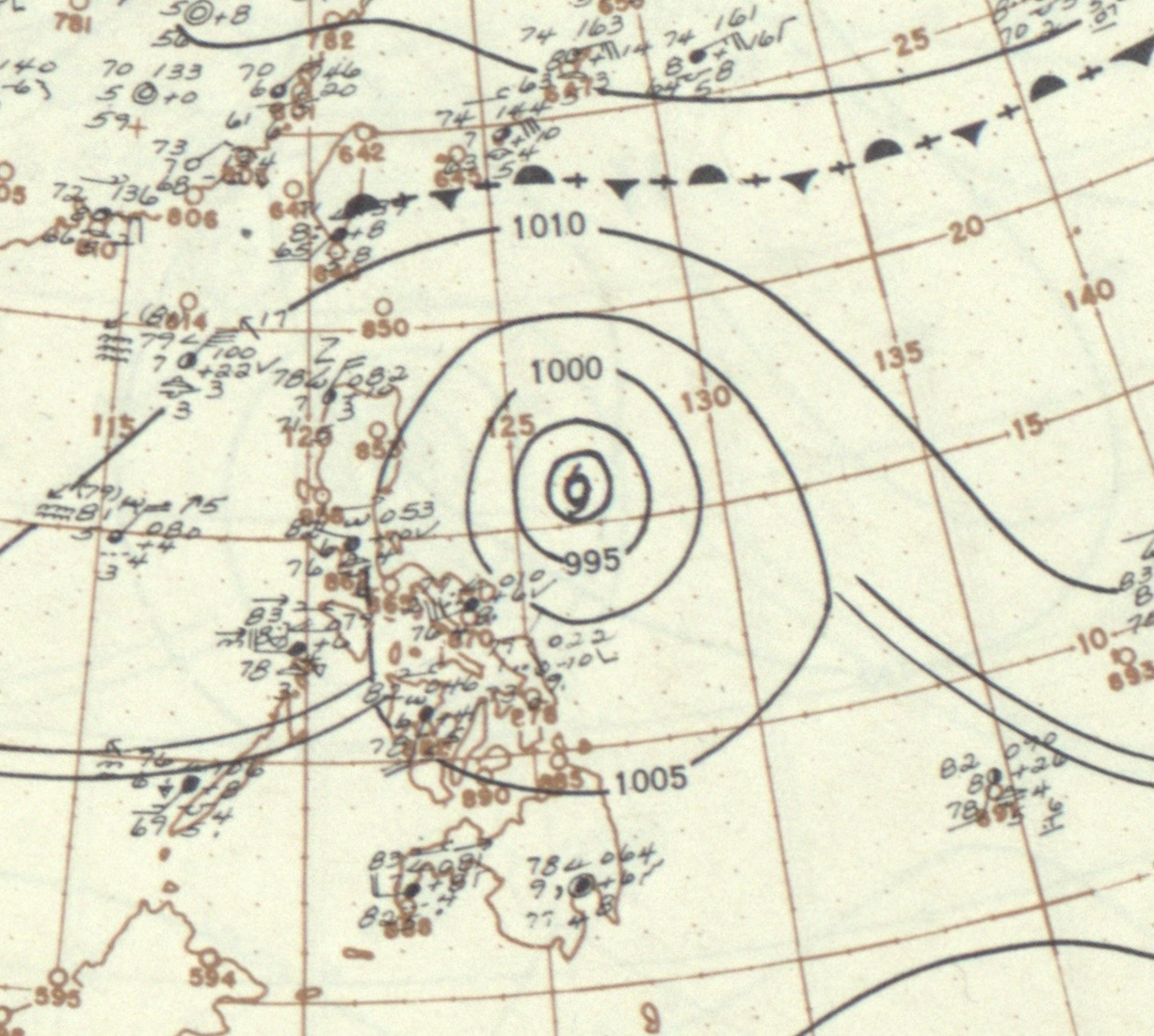
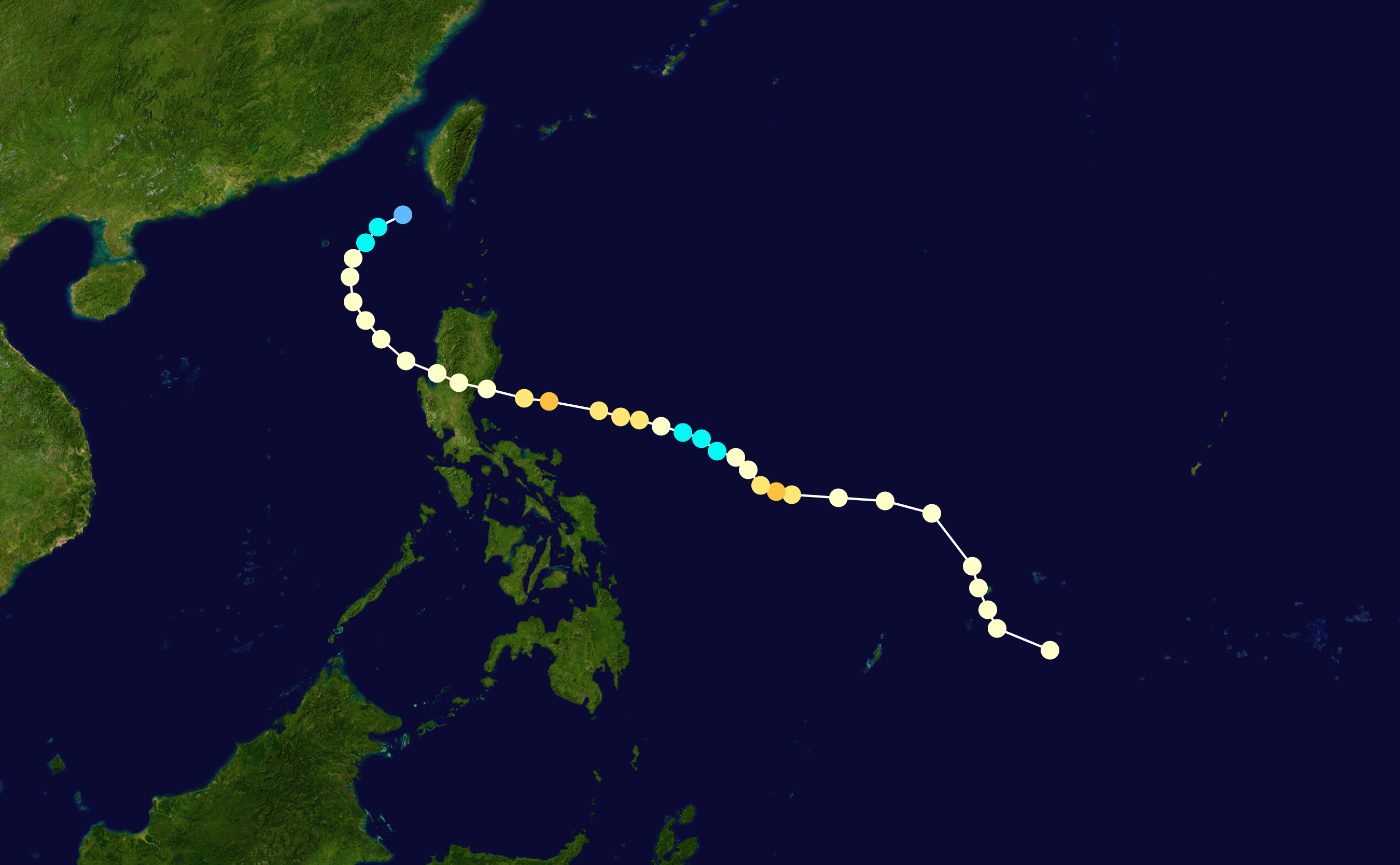
- Duration: November 2 – November 10
- Peak intensity: 185 km/h (115 mph) (1-min); 965 hPa (mbar)

Dora was a Category 3 typhoon that hit the Philippines.

=== Tropical Storm Elnora ===
- Tropical storm (SSHWS)
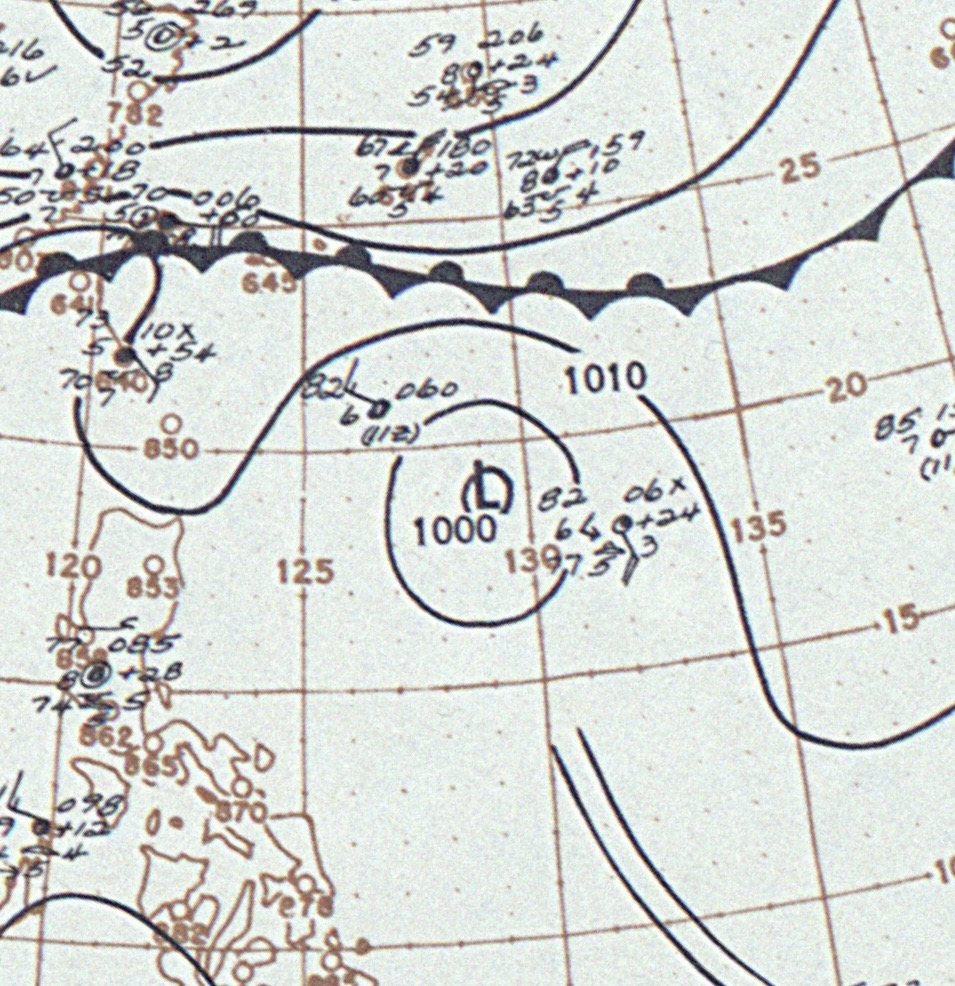
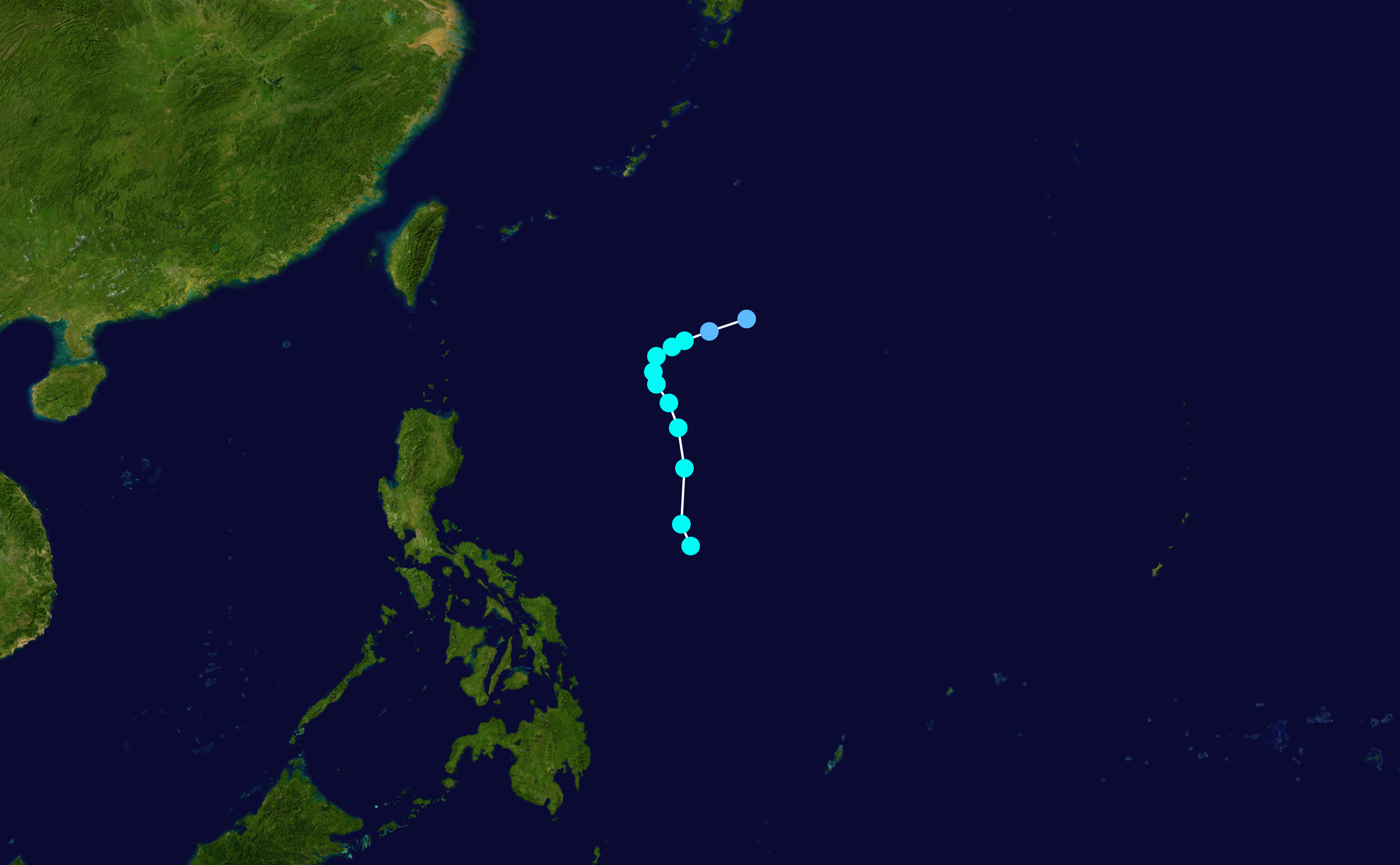
- Duration: November 10 – November 12
- Peak intensity: 95 km/h (60 mph) (1-min); 995 hPa (mbar)

Elnora was a short-lived tropical storm.

=== Typhoon Flora ===
- Category 3 typhoon (SSHWS)
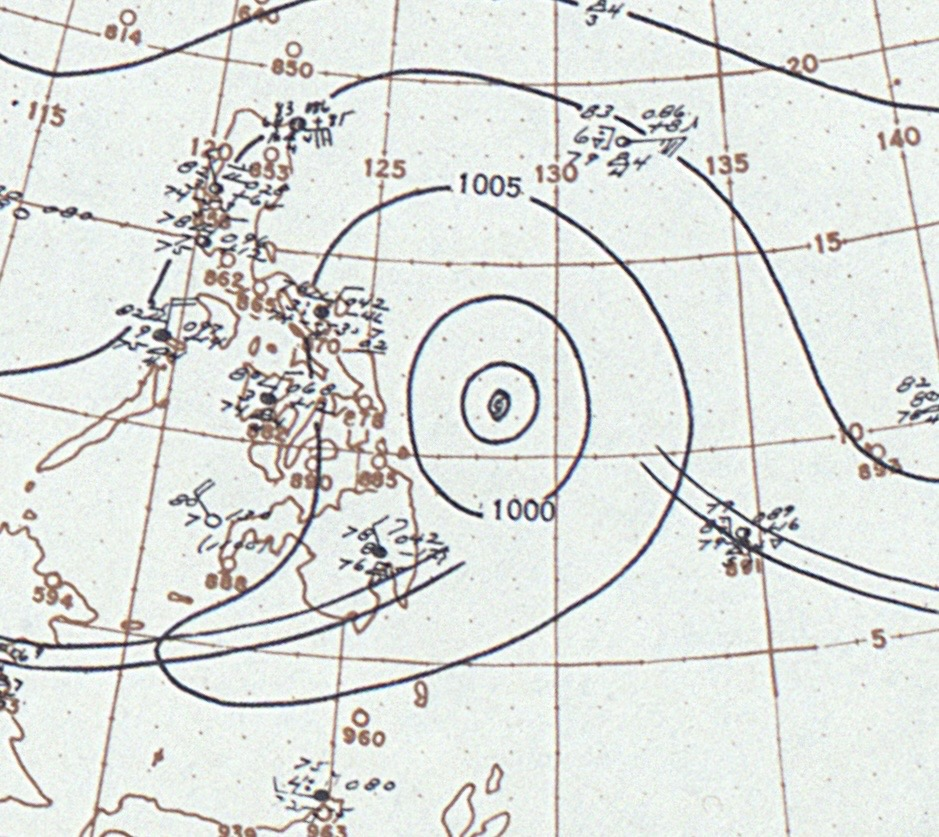
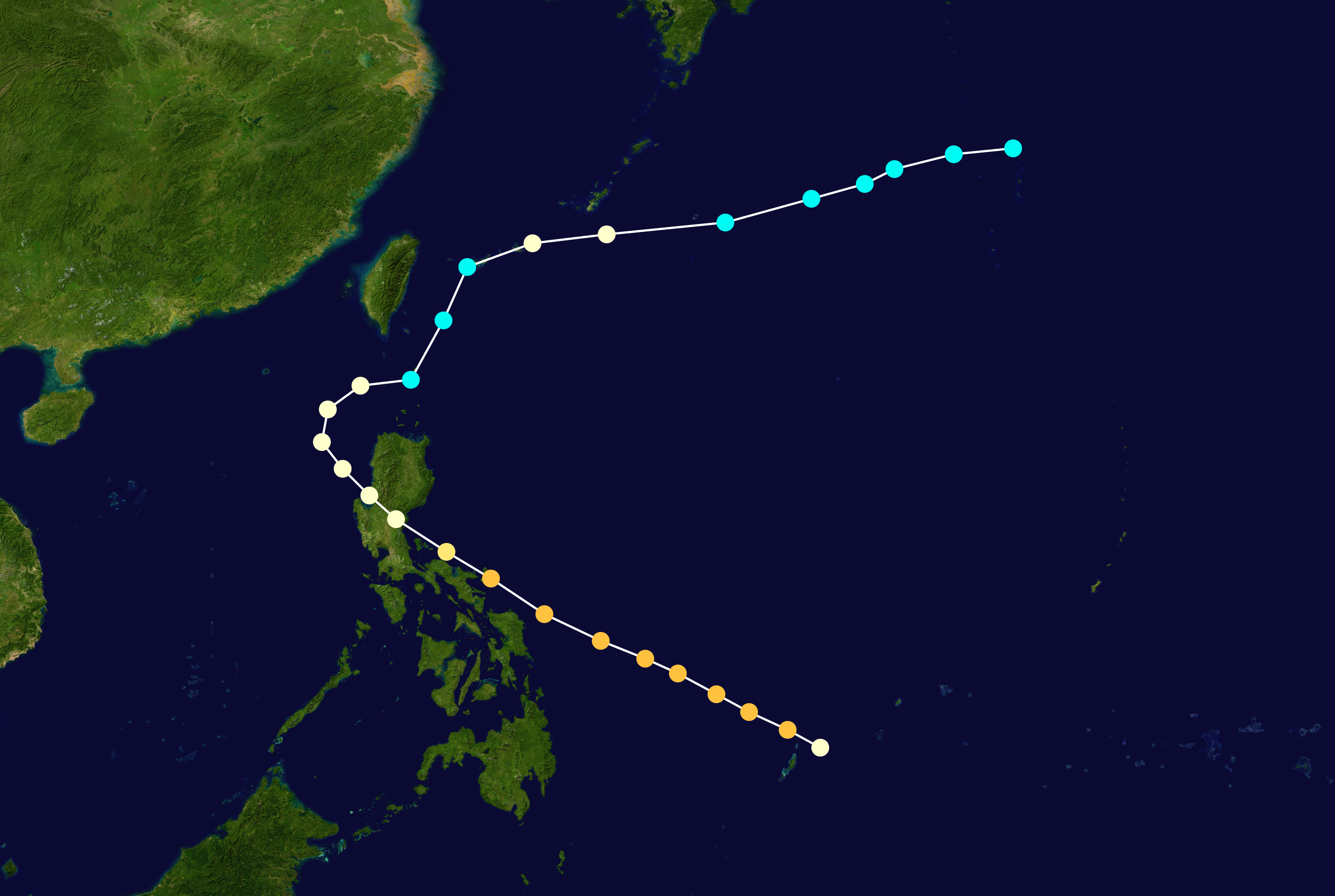
- Duration: November 13 – November 19
- Peak intensity: 185 km/h (115 mph) (1-min); 963 hPa (mbar)

Flora hit the Philippines as a category 3 typhoon.

=== Typhoon Gladys ===
- Category 1 typhoon (SSHWS)
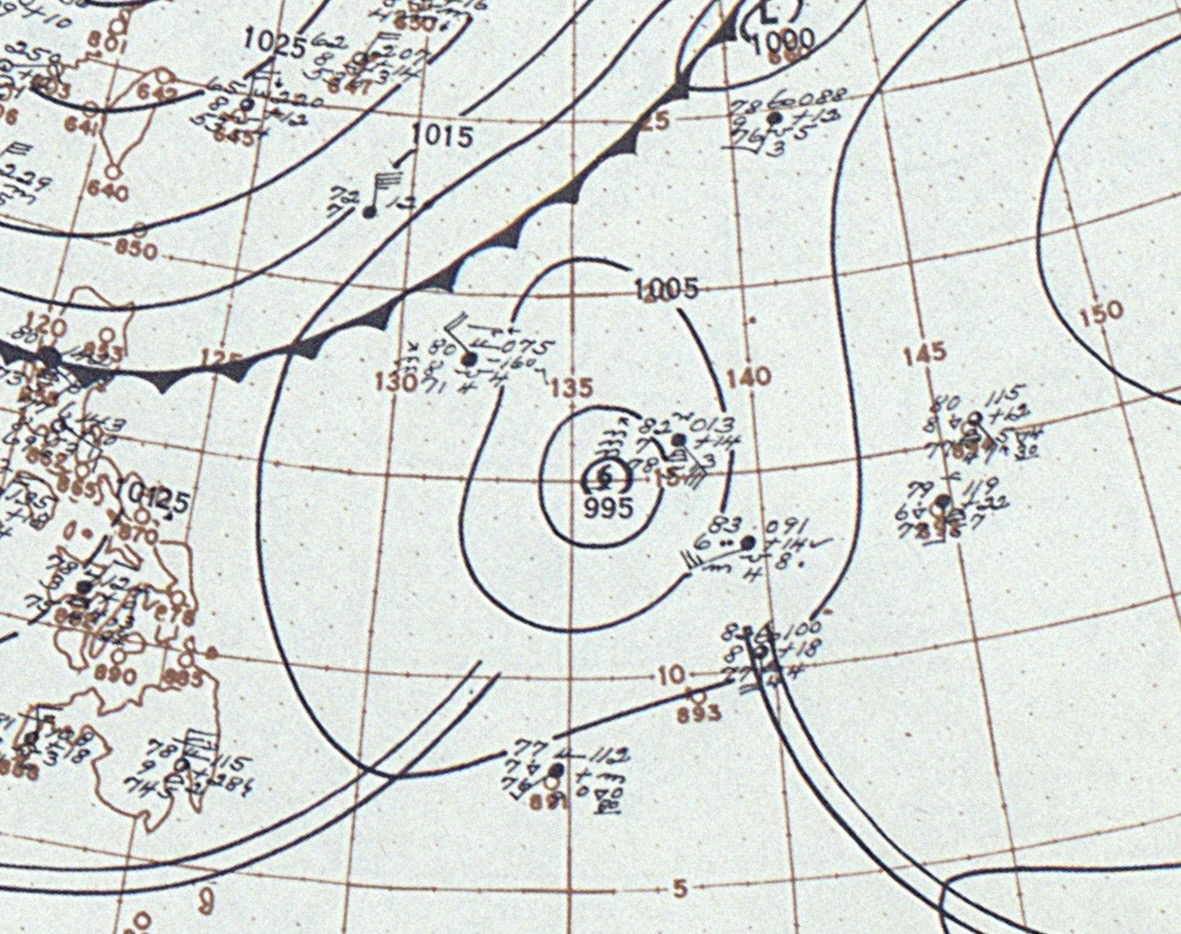
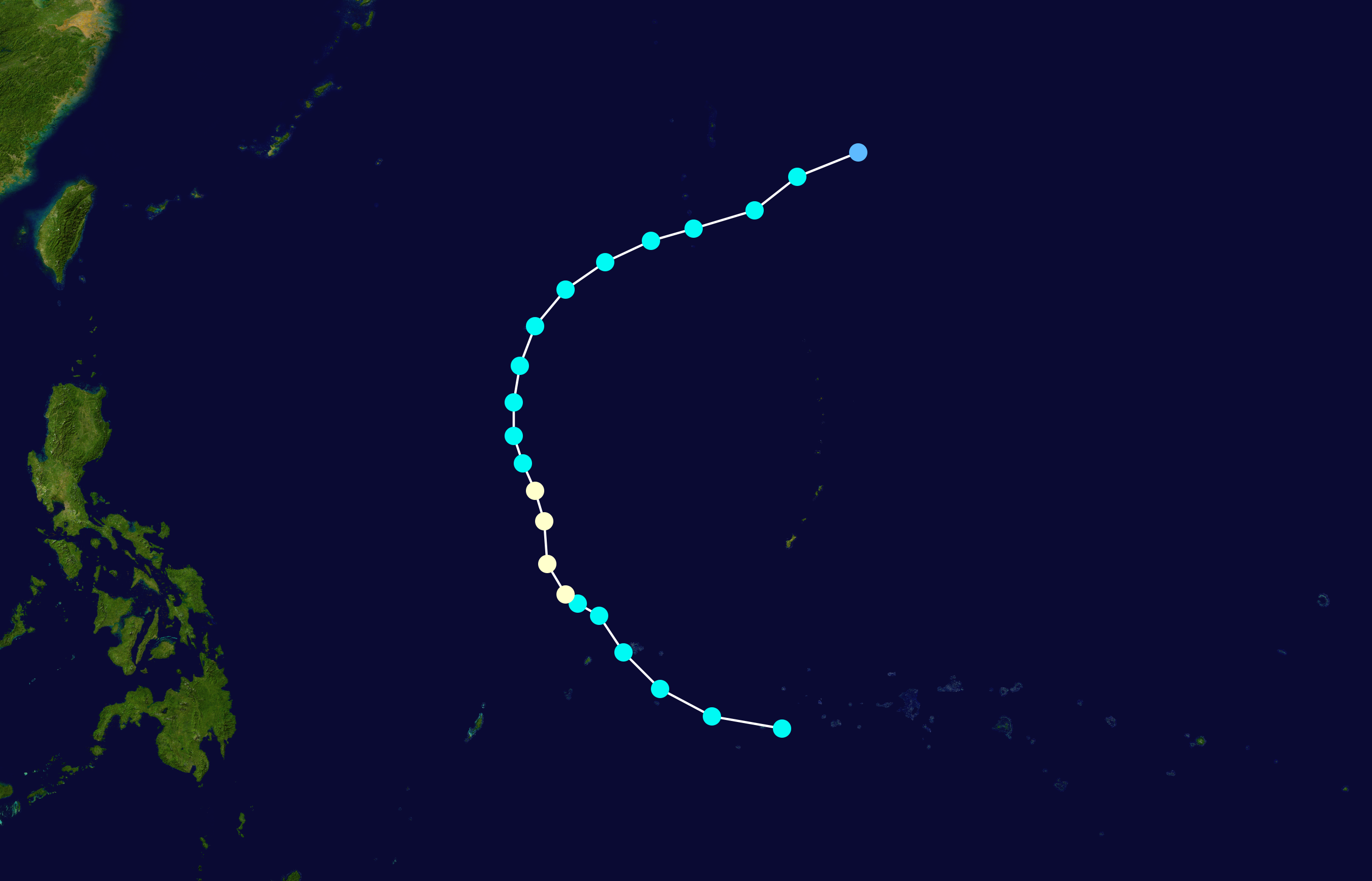
- Duration: November 17 – November 22
- Peak intensity: 140 km/h (85 mph) (1-min); 987 hPa (mbar)

Gladys was a category 1 typhoon that stayed out at sea.

=== Typhoon Hannah ===
- Category 3 typhoon (SSHWS)
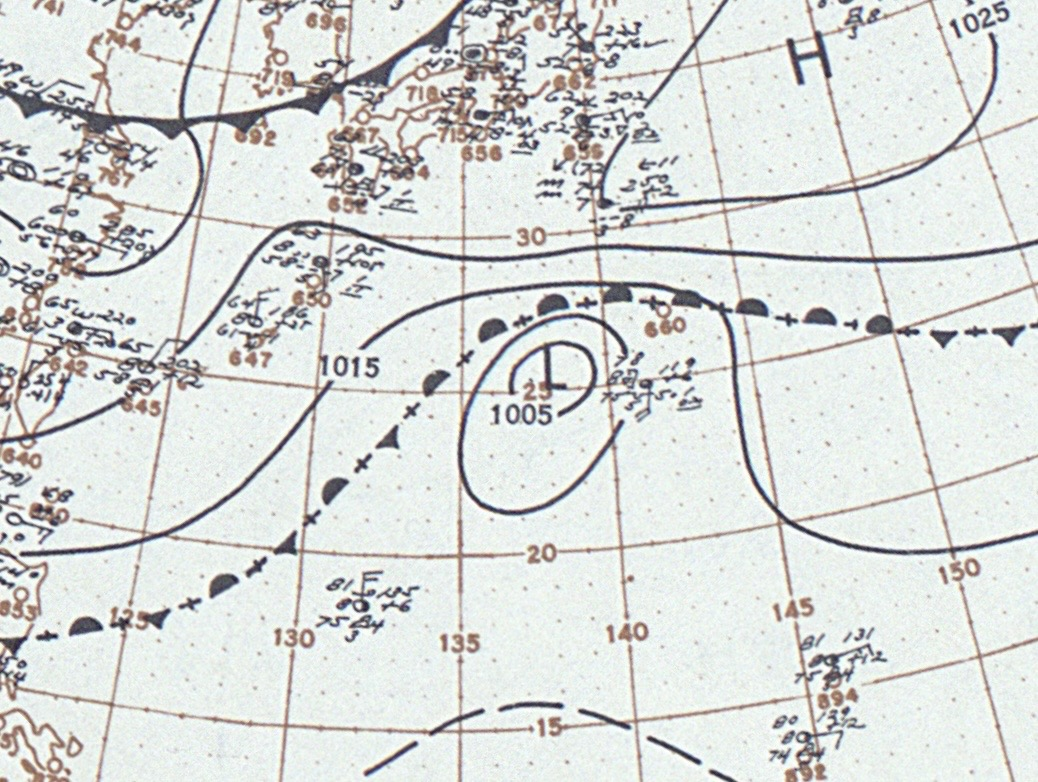
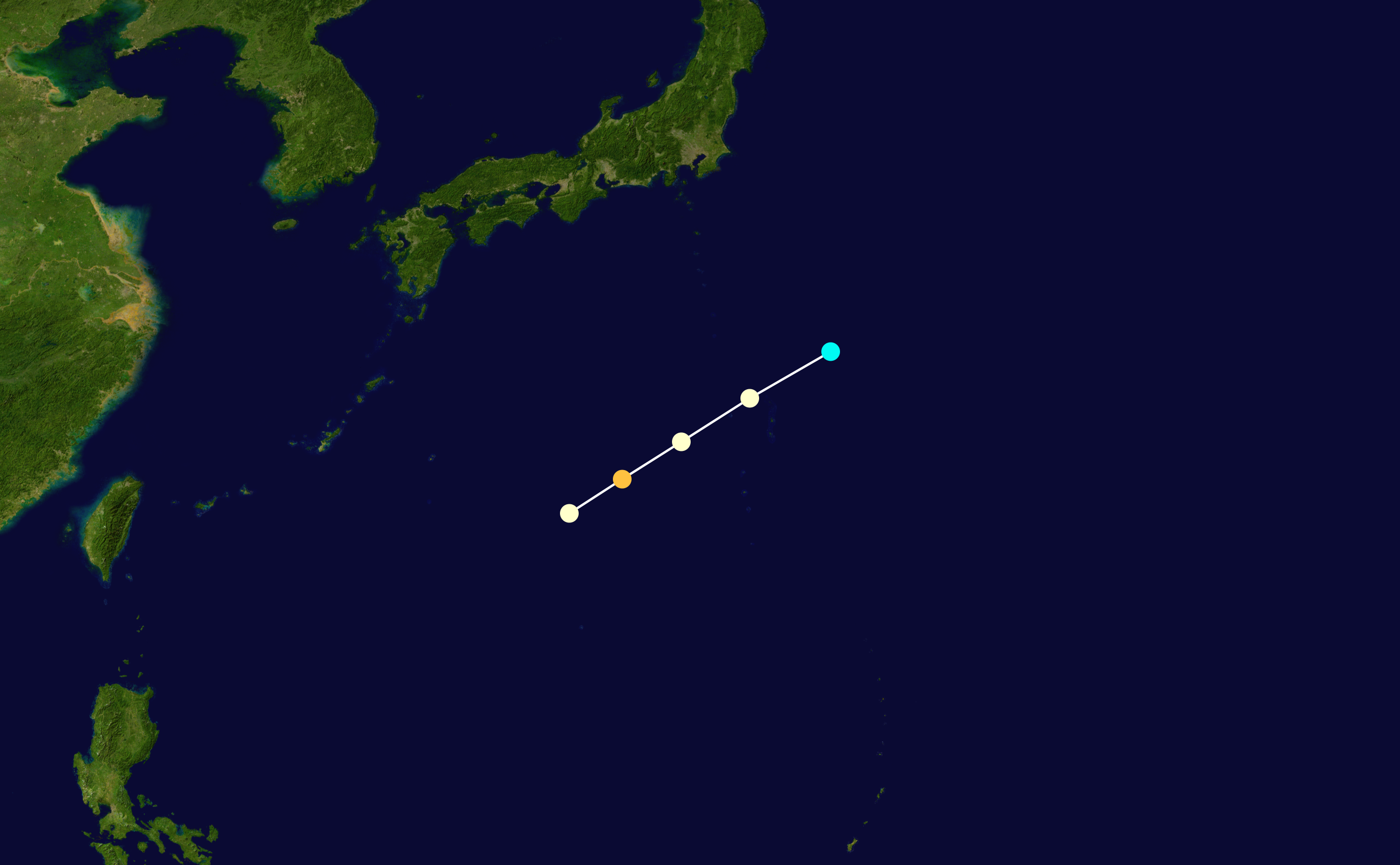
- Duration: November 22 – November 23
- Peak intensity: 185 km/h (115 mph) (1-min); 955 hPa (mbar)

Hannah was a category 3 typhoon. Its early track was likely lost due to the lack of meteorology observation.

=== Tropical Storm Irene ===
- Tropical storm (SSHWS)
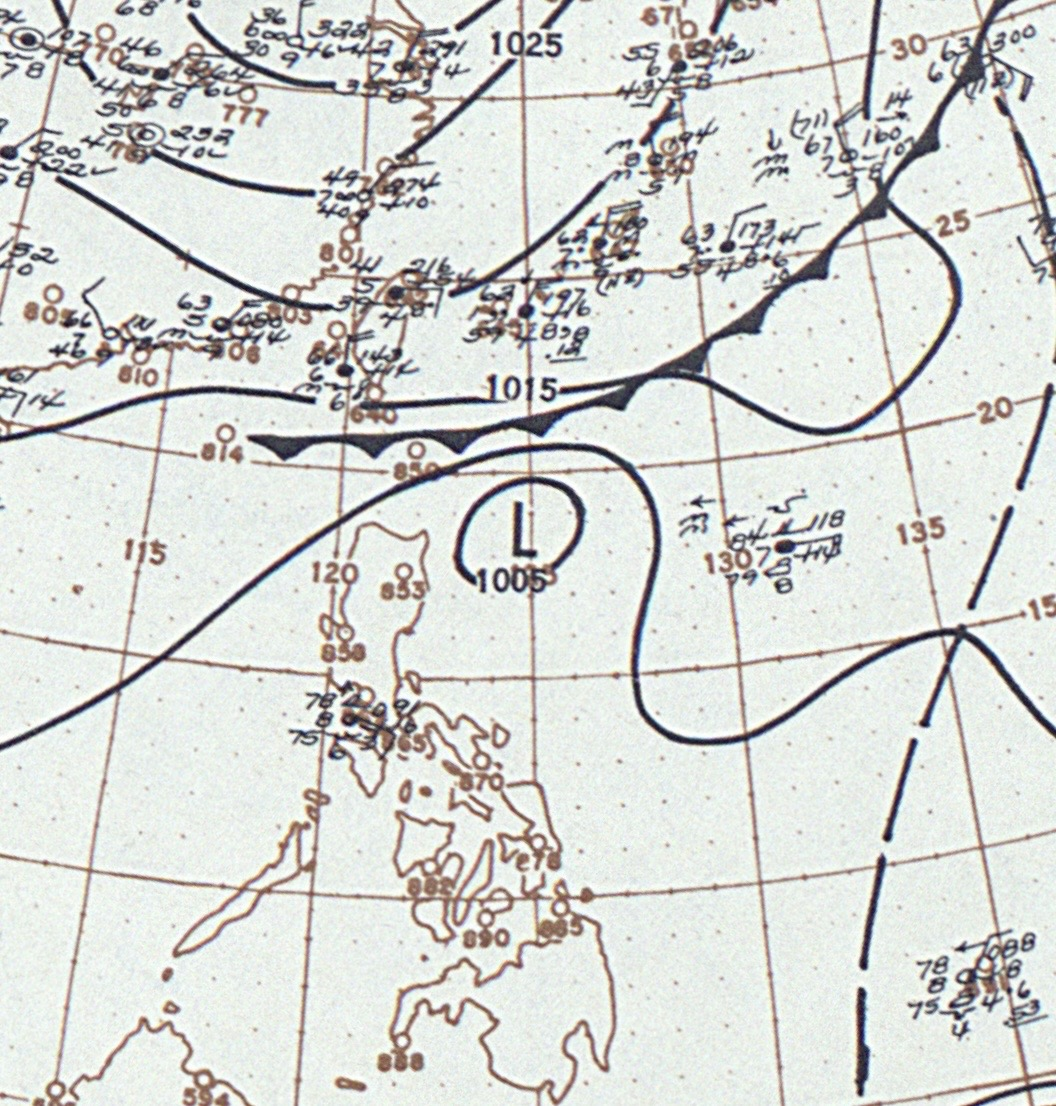
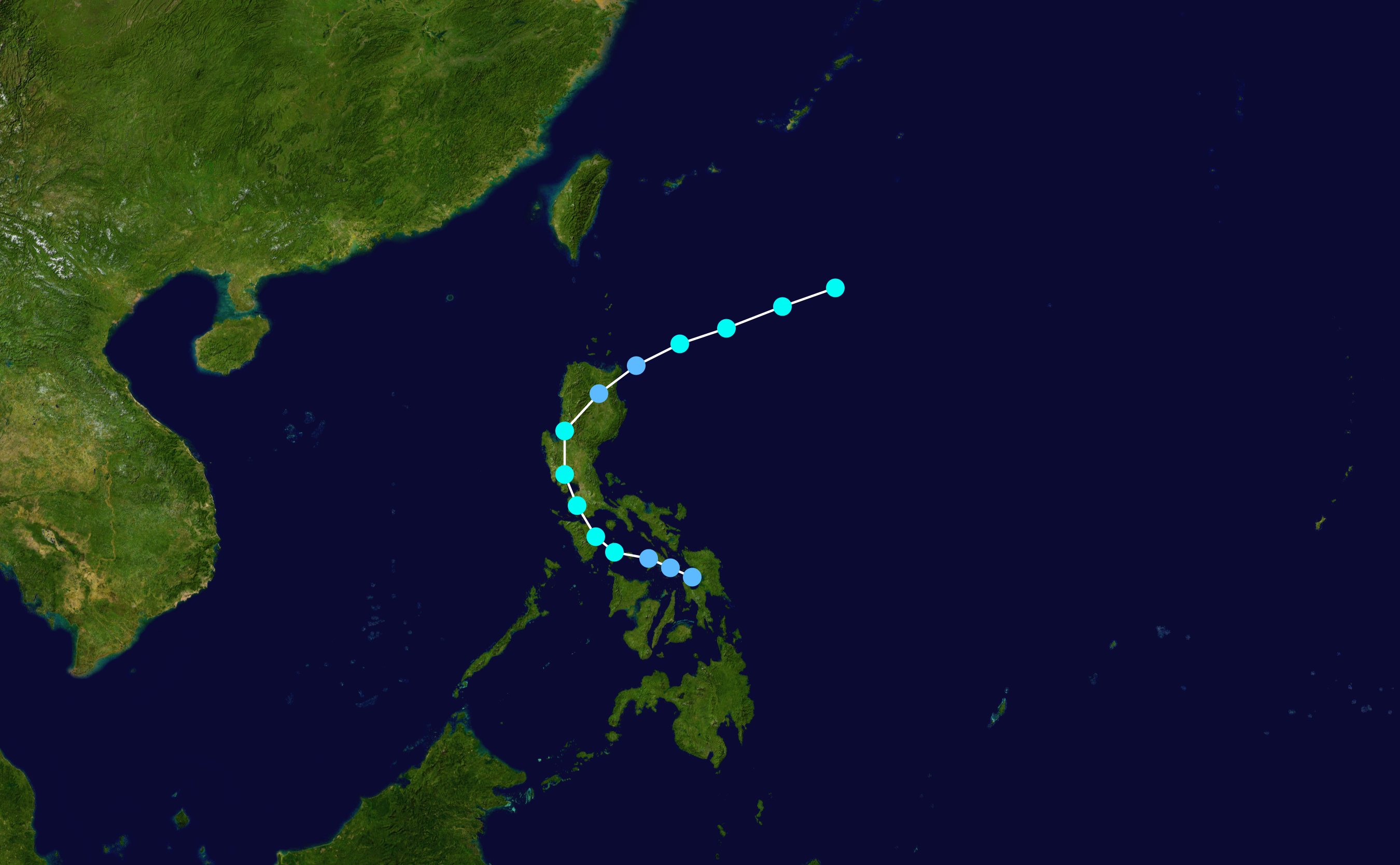
- Duration: November 30 – December 3
- Peak intensity: 85 km/h (50 mph) (1-min); 1000 hPa (mbar)

Tropical Storm Irene formed on November 30 between the Philippine Islands. It strengthened to a tropical storm with 50 mph winds before it made landfall on one of the islands. It curved northeast and weakened to a tropical depression. But after exiting land, it restrengthened to a moderate tropical storm. But shortly thereafter, it became extratropical on December 3. The Japan Meteorological Agency analyzed it as a tropical depression, though it was actually a moderate tropical storm.

=== Typhoon Jean ===
- Category 2 typhoon (SSHWS)
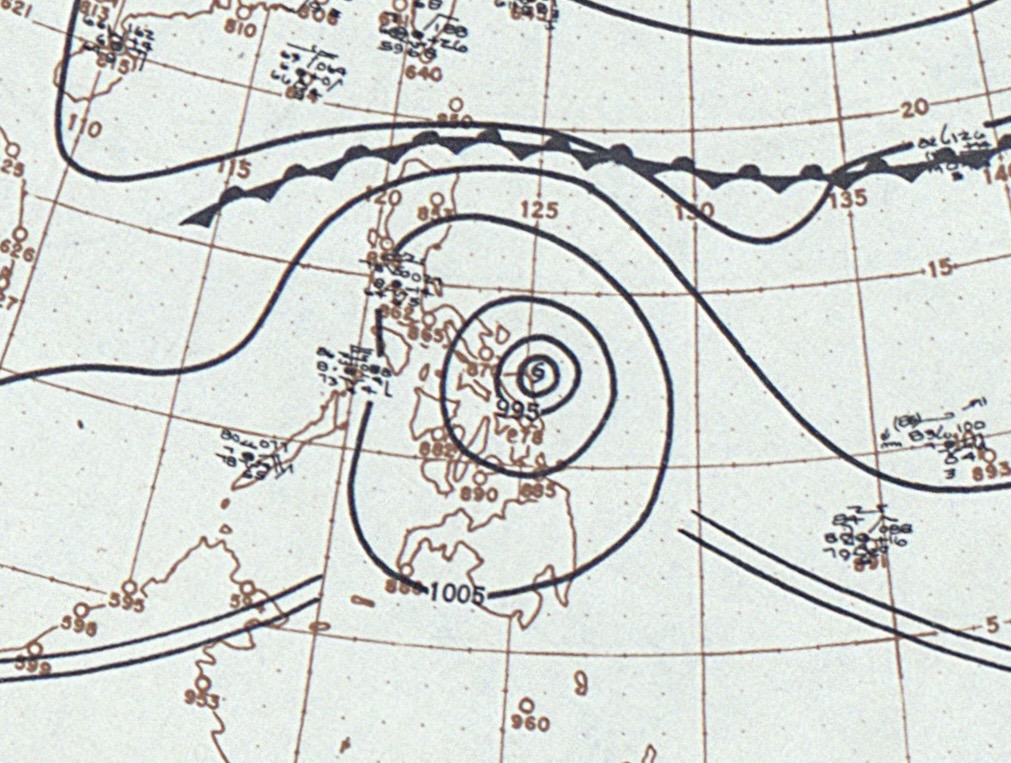
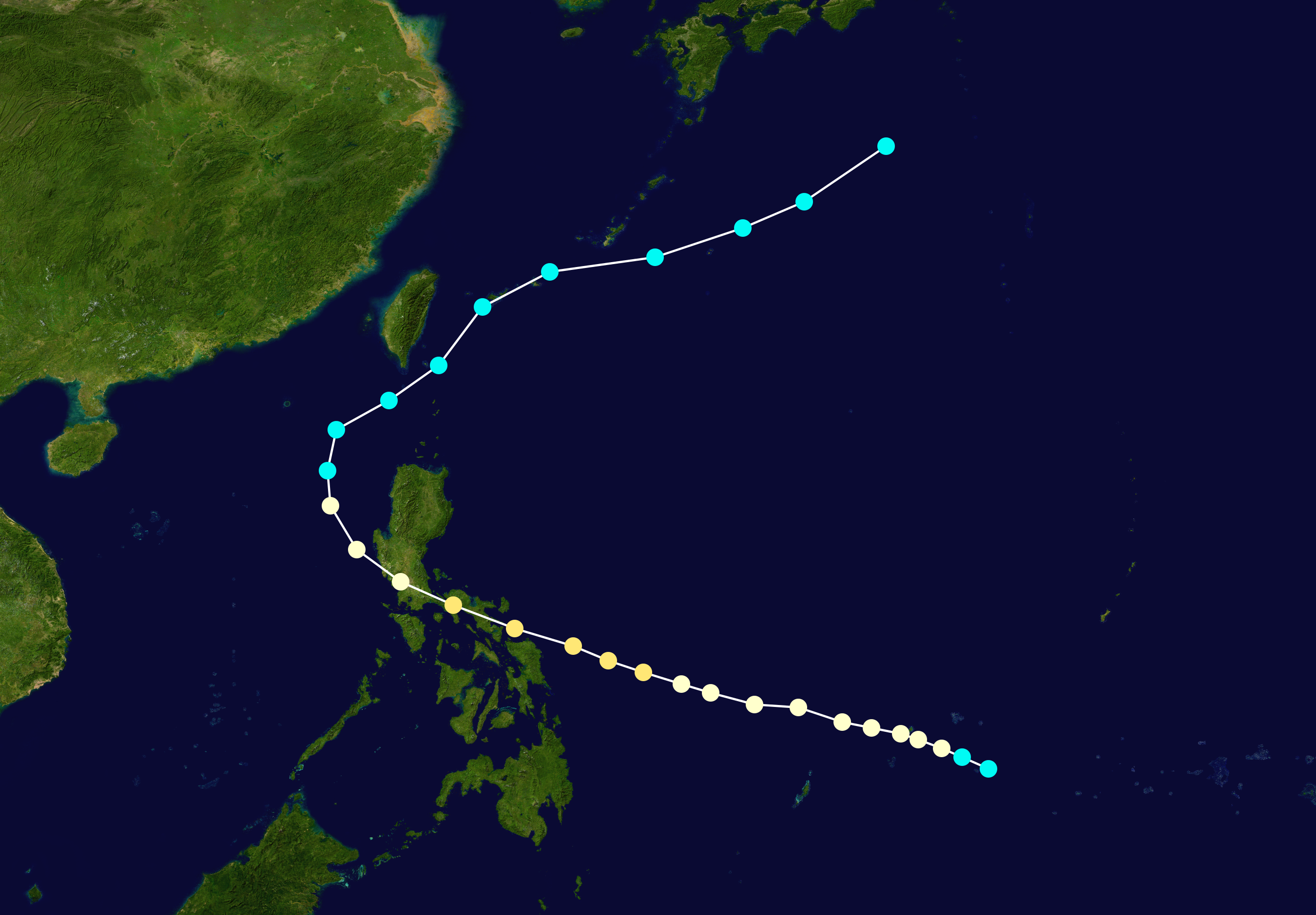
- Duration: December 22 – December 29
- Peak intensity: 175 km/h (110 mph) (1-min); 973 hPa (mbar)

Typhoon Jean made a direct hit over Manila during the Christmas holidays after organizing in the Philippine Sea to the southeast of Yap Island, moving west-northwest and accelerating as it made landfall in the border area of Albay and Camarines Sur. The storm continued its fast movement and track towards southern part of Manila and Southern Tagalog.

After passing Manila, the storm emerged from the coast of Zambales towards the South China Sea, starting to shift more towards the northwest and eventually north and northeast, all the way moving parallel to the coast of Luzon. The typhoon weakened into a tropical storm and recurved west of the Batanes group of islands and passed through the Bashi Channel south of Taiwan and continued north-eastward towards Miyakojima and the southern Japanese islands and eventually dissipated on 29 December. No data is available on what happened to the system after turning post-tropical.

The curved parabolic track of Typhoon Jean had its similar semblance to that of Typhoon Flora the month before. Because Typhoon Jean battered Manila during the Yuletide season, there were some eyewitness reports of Christmas decorations being strewn around the city. There were also reports of wind damage in the nearby suburb of Parañaque. It was the second recorded instance of a typhoon impacting the country during Christmas time, with the first being an unnamed (aka Quantico) typhoon in 1918, and the others being Typhoon Lee in 1981, Typhoon Axel in 1994 (which made landfall in Samar three days prior to Christmas Day of that year), Typhoon Nock-ten in 2016, and Typhoon Phanfone in 2019.

== Storm names ==
- Anna
- Bernida
- Carol
- Donna
- Eileen
- Faith
- Gwen
- Helena
- Inez
- Joyce
- Kathleen
- Laura
- Mildred
- Nanette
- Olive
- Pauline
- Rosalind
- Alice
- Beatrice
- Cathy
- Dora
- Elnora
- Flora
- Gladys
- Hannah
- Irene
- Jean

== See also ==
- 1947 Atlantic hurricane season
- Pacific typhoon season
- 1900–1950 South-West Indian Ocean cyclone seasons
- 1940s Australian region cyclone seasons
- 1940s South Pacific cyclone seasons
