= List of Arizona hurricanes =

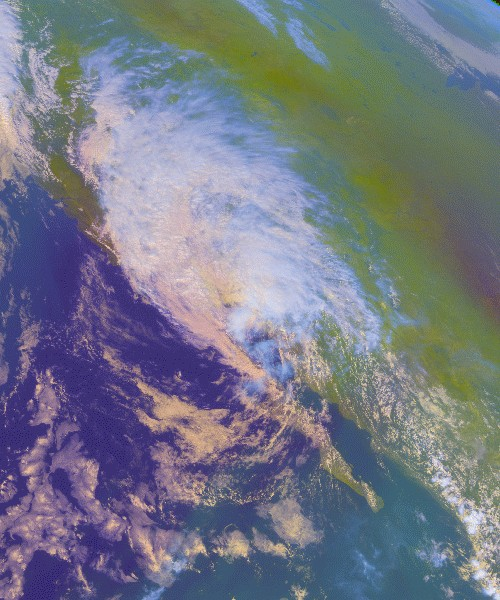
The remnants of Hurricane Nora over the Southwestern United States

Arizona has been affected by hurricanes on numerous occasions. Usually, these storms originate in the eastern Pacific Ocean, make landfall in the Mexican states of Baja California or Sonora, and dissipate before crossing into the United States. Thus, in most cases, it is only the tropical cyclones' remnant moisture that produces heavy rainfall—and in some occasions, flooding—in portions of Arizona. However, approximately every five years, a tropical cyclone retains sufficient strength to enter the state as a tropical storm or a tropical depression. Arizonans can expect indirect flash floods caused by the remnants of tropical cyclones to occur about every two years.

Tropical cyclones in Arizona are not common, since the predominant wind pattern steers most storms that form in the Eastern Pacific either parallel or away from the Pacific coast of northwestern Mexico. As a result, most storms that could affect Arizona are carried away from the United States, with only 6% of all Pacific hurricanes entering US territory. Not all Arizona hurricanes originate from the Pacific Ocean, however; in July 2008, an Atlantic hurricane named Hurricane Dolly produced rainfall in the eastern portion of the state, and another Atlantic storm reached Arizona as a tropical depression. Many, but not all, of these systems also impacted California.

Despite their rarity, tropical cyclones are among Arizona's most significant weather makers. In years when Arizona is affected by a tropical cyclone, these can be responsible for up to 25% of the rainfall in areas along the Colorado River. Arizona hurricanes are also responsible for torrential rains in localized areas, with the state's 24-hour rainfall record—11.97 inches (304 mm) of precipitation—occurring during Hurricane Nora's landfall in 1997. The heavy rainfall can trigger extensive flash floods, such as the ones produced by the remnants of Tropical Storm Octave in 1983, or the lingering moisture from Tropical Storm Emilia in 2006.

== Climatology ==
Wettest tropical cyclones and their remnants in Arizona Highest-known totals
Precipitation			Storm	Location	Ref.
Rank	mm	in	Storm	Location	Ref.
1	344.4	13.56	Unnamed 1951	Crown King	
1	305.1	12.01	Nora 1997	Harquahala Mountains	
2	304.8	12.00	Octave 1983	Mount Graham	
3	289.6	11.40	Norma 1970	Workman Creek	
4	210.8	8.30	Heather 1977	Nogales	
5	209.8	8.26	Unnamed 1926	Hereford	
6	178.6	7.03	Unnamed 1939	Wikieup	
7	178.1	7.01	Doreen 1977	Yuma Valley	
8	177.8	7.00	Javier 2004	Walnut Creek	
9	166.9	6.57	Newton 2016	Rincon Mountains	
10	158.8	6.25	Norbert 2014	Tempe 3.1 WSW	

Tropical cyclones are not common over Arizona, but on average, a tropical storm or a tropical depression affects the state approximately every five years. However, indirect flash floods caused by the remnants of tropical cyclones are more common, as they tend to occur about every two years.

Storms that approach the southwestern United States, specifically Arizona, generally track closer to the Mexican coast than average, making them more likely to recurve northwards under the influence of an approaching trough. These troughs tend to extend farther to the south during the latter part of the Pacific hurricane season, in the period between late August and early October. These pronounced troughs thus produce a synoptic-scale flow that is conducive to steering hurricanes towards the southwestern United States. All of the systems that have impacted Arizona have formed in the Pacific hurricane season, and only storm remnants have affected the state before August.

The infusions of tropical moisture from tropical cyclones can be a significant portion of the annual rainfall in the region. In years when storms approach Arizona, eastern and northern portions of the state receive on average 6–8% of the monsoon-season precipitation from tropical systems and their remnants. This percentage rises towards the southwestern corner of the state, which can receive up to a quarter of its monsoon-season rainfall from tropical cyclones.

== Storm systems ==
Number of storms affecting Arizona
Month	Number of storms
June	3
July	2
August	12
September	21
October	10

Chronology of tropical cyclones in Arizona
Storm	Peak intensity	Season	Intensity	Date
Unnamed	Unknown	1921	Remnant low	August 20, 1921
Unnamed	Unknown	1921	Tropical depression	September 30, 1921
Unnamed	Unknown	1926	Remnant low	September 20, 1926
Unnamed	Unknown	1927	Remnant low	September 7, 1927
One	Category 1	1929	Tropical depression	June 30, 1929
Unnamed	Unknown	1935	Tropical storm	August 22, 1935
Unnamed	Tropical storm	1951	Tropical storm	August 3, 1951
Unnamed	Category 1	1958	Tropical storm	October 6, 1958
Claudia	Tropical storm	1962	Tropical storm	September 25, 1962
Tillie	Tropical storm	1964	Remnant low	September 9, 1964
Emily	Category 1	1965	Remnant low	September 6, 1965
Kirsten	Tropical storm	1966	Remnant low	September 29, 1966
Katrina	Category 1	1967	Tropical storm	August 29, 1967
Hyacinth	Tropical storm	1968	Tropical depression	August 20, 1968
Pauline	Category 1	1968	Remnant low	October 3, 1968
Norma	Tropical storm	1970	Remnant low	September 4, 1970
Irene-Olivia	Category 3	1971	Remnant low	October 1, 1971
Joanne	Category 2	1972	Tropical storm	October 4, 1972
Kathleen	Category 1	1976	Tropical storm	September 10, 1976
Liza	Category 4	1976	Remnant low	October 2, 1976
Doreen	Category 1	1977	Tropical storm	August 13, 1977
Heather	Category 1	1977	Tropical depression	October 4, 1977
Octave	Tropical storm	1983	Tropical storm	September 28, 1983
Norbert	Category 4	1984	Tropical depression	September 25, 1984
Polo	Category 3	1984	Remnant low	October 3, 1984
Raymond	Category 3	1989	Tropical depression	October 5, 1989
Boris	Category 1	1990	Remnant low	June 11, 1990
Lester	Category 1	1992	Tropical storm	August 22, 1992
Hilary	Category 3	1993	Remnant low	August 27, 1993
Flossie	Category 1	1995	Remnant low	August 11, 1995
Ismael	Category 1	1995	Remnant low	September 15, 1995
Nora	Category 4	1997	Tropical storm	September 25, 1997
Frank	Tropical storm	1998	Remnant low	August 9, 1998
Isis	Category 1	1998	Remnant low	September 5, 1998
Olivia	Tropical storm	2000	Remnant low	October 11, 2000
Juliette	Category 4	2001	Remnant low	October 3, 2001
Ignacio	Category 2	2003	Remnant low	August 25, 2003
Marty	Category 2	2003	Remnant low	September 22, 2003
Javier	Category 4	2004	Remnant low	September 20, 2004
Emilia	Tropical storm	2006	Remnant low	July 25, 2006
John	Category 4	2006	Remnant low	September 5, 2006
Henriette	Category 1	2007	Remnant low	September 6, 2007
Dolly	Category 2	2008	Remnant low	July 28, 2008
Julio	Tropical storm	2008	Remnant low	August 25, 2008
Jimena	Category 4	2009	Remnant low	September 5, 2009
Norbert	Category 3	2014	Remnant low	September 8, 2014
Odile	Category 4	2014	Remnant low	September 17, 2014
Newton	Category 1	2016	Remnant low	September 7, 2016
Rosa	Category 4	2018	Tropical depression	October 2, 2018
Sergio	Category 4	2018	Tropical depression	October 13, 2018
Hilary	Category 4	2023	Remnant low	August 20, 2023

=== Before 1960 ===
Records of tropical cyclones in the East Pacific before 1950 are sparse, but there were still several storms that produced rainfall over Arizona in this period.

- August 1921: The first known tropical disturbance to affect the state occurred when a remnant low of a tropical cyclone moved into the western portions of the state.
- September 1921: A tropical depression that had tracked parallel to the Mexican coastline moved into Arizona, causing heavy rainfall on September 30. This tropical storm caused more than three inches of rainfall along the Colorado River valley, with 3.65 inches (93 mm) of rain reported in Yuma. Throughout the state, Flagstaff saw 1.50 inches (38 mm) of rainfall, while 1.24 inches (31 mm) of precipitation fell in Prescott, 0.68 inches (17 mm) in Tucson, and 0.56 inches (14 mm) in Phoenix.
- September 1926: Five years later, the remnants of another September storm hit the state, but this time the precipitation was heaviest on the southeastern portion of the state. The 1926 storm caused over 5.00 inches (127 mm) of rain in the vicinity of Douglas.
- September 1927: The remnants of another tropical system caused 1–2 inches (25–51 mm) of rainfall throughout the state.
- June 1929: The Atlantic hurricane reanalysis project discovered that a rare Atlantic hurricane reached the eastern part of the state as a tropical depression. Damage from this storm, if any, is unknown.
- August 1935: The remnants of an unnamed tropical storm that landed on Southern California caused torrential rain and flooding across Arizona, especially along the Santa Cruz River and Rillito Creek on Southern Arizona. The rainfall from the storm contributed to an extremely wet month of August, which still holds the monthly rainfall record at the National Weather Service office in Tucson, as 5.61 inches (142 mm) of rainfall fell during the month.
- September 1939: Two tropical systems entered the state during the month. On September 4, the remnants of a former hurricane entered southwest Arizona, near Yuma. More than 5.00 inches (127 mm) of precipitation fell in northwest Arizona, with many parts of the state collecting more than an inch of rain. This same system produced more than twice the average annual rainfall in Imperial Valley, California. On the 11th, the remnants of a separate system also passed over southwest Arizona.
- August 1951: No tropical cyclones are known to have affected Arizona in the 1940s. However, in the 1950s, the remnants of two more storms affected the state. On August 24, 1951, the moisture from a hurricane that made landfall in Baja California moved over the state, producing more than 5.00 inches (127 mm) of precipitation over southwestern Arizona. Flagstaff saw 4.00 inches (102 mm) of rain, with similar totals measured at Prescott (3.95 inches; 100 mm) and Phoenix (3.24 inches; 82 mm). The storm also washed out several roadways near Gila Bend, isolating the city from motorists. Overall, the storm caused $750,000 (1951 USD) in property damage.
- July 1954: Three years later, the remnants of another hurricane moved over Arizona from the south during the month of July. Damage from this storm is unknown.

=== 1960s ===
- September 1962: Remnant moisture from Tropical Storm Claudia caused severe flash floods in the vicinity of Tucson, with 5 to 7 inches (130 to 180 mm) of precipitation falling over the headwaters of the washes of Santa Rosa, Jackrabbit, and Brawley during a 14- to 15-hour period. Over 7 inches (180 mm) of rainfall also fell near the Arizona-Sonora Desert Museum. The ensuing flood of the Santa Cruz River and its tributaries produced a path of destruction about 100 miles (160 km) long and up to 8 miles (13 km) wide. Santa Rosa Wash conveyed 53,100 cubic feet per second (1,500 m^{3}/s) at its peak; Los Robles Wash carried up to 32,600 cu ft/s (920 m^{3}/s), while the Santa Cruz River proper peaked at 9,200 cu ft/s (260 m^{3}/s). The washes and rivers reached depths of up to 20 feet (6.1 m), and overflowed its banks in places by 1 to 6 feet (0.30 to 1.83 m). Flooding from the storm inundated the towns of Marana and Sells, both in Pima County. Total damage in Pima and Pinal Counties exceeded $11 million (1962 USD).
- September 1964: The next storm to affect the state was Tropical Storm Tillie in 1964. Although the storm remained at sea, its residual moisture was advected over southern Arizona, allowing a passing cold front to trigger widespread showers and thunderstorms on the evening of September 9. Tucson received 3.05 inches (77 mm) of rainfall in a 24-hour period between September 9 and 10, and two locations—one in the Catalina Mountain foothills and one near Sahuarita—recorded 6.75 inches (171 mm) of precipitation. Coupled with rain during the previous week, the Santa Cruz River produced heavy runoff, with peak flows of 15,900 cu ft/s (450 m^{3}/s) recorded near Cortaro.
- September 1965: The following year, the remnants of Hurricane Emily crossed into Arizona from Baja California. Any damage from the storm is not known.
- September 1966: The remnants of Kirsten caused 1.26 inches (32 mm) of rainfall in Nogales.
- August 1967: Hurricane Katrina brought heavy rainfall into the southern portion of the state as a tropical depression. The decaying storm produced about 2 inches (51 mm) of rainfall across southern Arizona. The peak recorded rainfall occurred at Wellton, where 4.78 inches (121 mm) were measured between September 1 and 2. Yuma recorded 1.88 inches (48 mm) within a 24-hour period; that was the heaviest rainfall recorded in a four-year period, and was more than the normal rainfall that the city receives during the entire fall season.
- August 1968: Two storms approached Arizona in 1968. The first was Tropical Storm Hyacinth in August. It reached the southeastern corner of the state as a tropical depression, and produced showers and thunderstorms over the eastern portion of the state.
- October 1968: The last storm to impact Arizona during the decade was Hurricane Pauline, which added high amounts of moisture ahead of a cold front in early October. The added instability in the atmosphere allowed the cold front to produce severe thunderstorms, including an F2 tornado that wrecked several homes and caused $250,000 (1968 USD) in damage when it touched down in Glendale.

=== 1970s ===
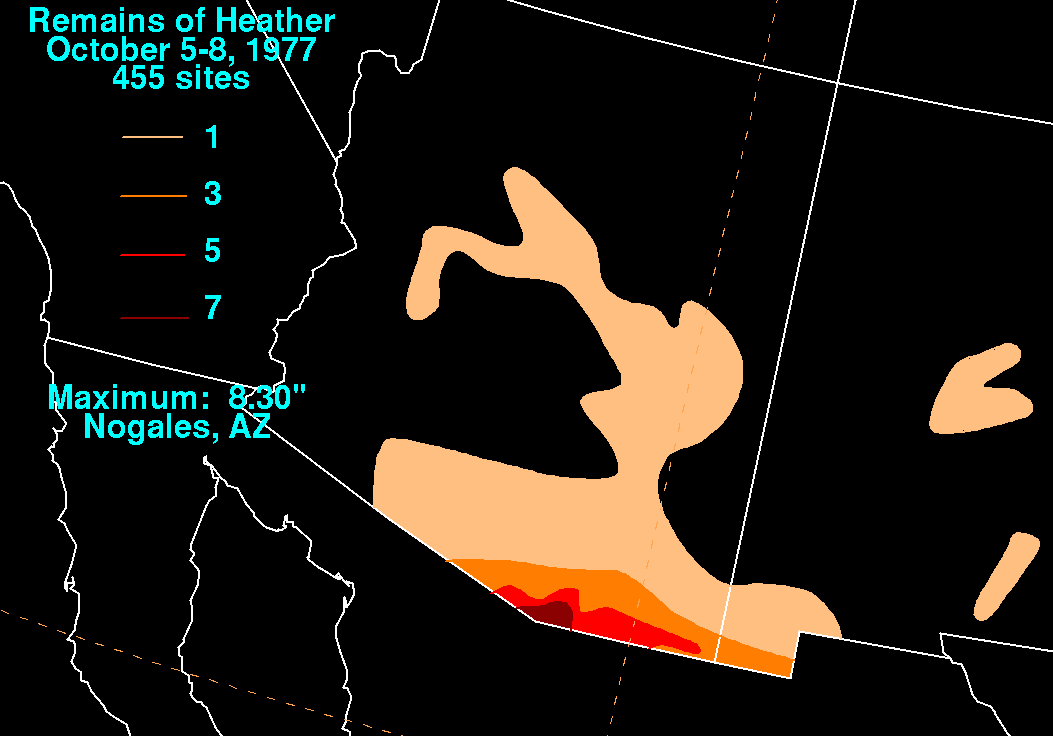
The rainfall produced by Hurricane Heather was concentrated along the United States–Mexico border.

- September 1970: The remnants of Tropical Storm Norma became Arizona's deadliest storm when they contributed to the disaster known as the "Labor Day storm of 1970". As Norma dissipated, moisture from the cyclone was entrapped in a large extratropical low. Much of the southern and central parts of the state saw 2 to 5 inches (51 to 127 mm) of rainfall, and mountainous locations saw between 8 and 11.4 inches (200 and 290 mm). Much of the region saw extensive flash flooding that killed 23 people and caused significant damage.
- October 1971: The following year, Hurricane Olivia produced over 2 inches (51 mm) of rainfall across Arizona, triggering flash flood warnings throughout the region. Pinal Ranch reported 5.33 inches (135 mm) of precipitation, while Mount Lemmon measured 3.81 inches (97 mm). Olivia's remnants also caused three major power outages near Yuma and produced flooding that resulted in the closure of a portion of U.S. Route 95. In Navajo and Pinal counties, the rainfall damaged roads, bridges, sewers, and homes, which amounted to about $250,000 in repair work for the state of Arizona.
- October 1972: Hurricane Joanne entered Arizona as a tropical storm before dissipating near Flagstaff. Many areas of the state received between 1 and 3 inches (25 and 76 mm) of rainfall, with isolated locations receiving over 5 inches (130 mm). The Nogales Highway Bridge over the Santa Cruz River was washed away by the flooding. The heavy rain from Joanne saturated the soils for a later storm that produced flooding that caused $10 million (1972 USD) in property damage and eight deaths.
- September 1976: On September 11, Hurricane Kathleen entered southern California, producing tropical-storm-force winds over western and possibly southern Arizona. Yuma reported maximum sustained winds of 57 miles per hour (92 km/h) and gusts of 76 miles per hour (122 km/h) before the measuring station lost power. The winds from Kathleen killed a man when a gust of wind blew a palm tree down onto his mobile home. Severe flooding and hailstorms also resulted. While most of the rainfall from the storm fell in California, 2.87 inches (73 mm) fell at the Davis Dam on the Colorado River.
- October 1976: The next month, Hurricane Liza brought light rain to the state, with the state maximum being 1.48 inches (38 mm) on Willow Beach.
- August 1977: Hurricane Doreen caused severe flooding in Yuma County and near Bullhead City. A rain gauge near the city of Yuma saw more than 7 inches (180 mm) of precipitation during the storm.
- October 1977: The remnants of Hurricane Heather caused 8.30 inches (211 mm) of rain in Nogales. Extensive bank erosion occurred across southeastern Arizona, as rivers crested over their 100-year flood levels, and 400 people were forced to evacuate their homes. Total damage from the storm was assessed at $15 million (1977 USD).

=== 1980s ===
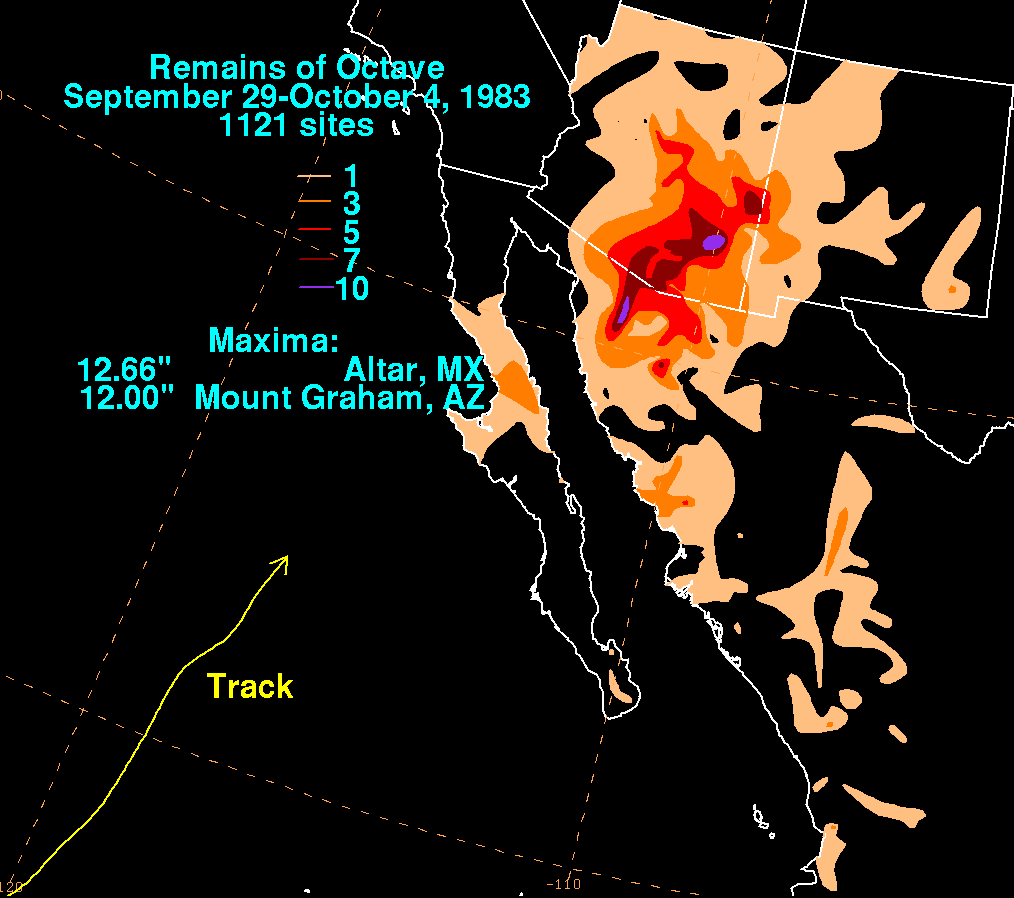
Rainfall due to Tropical Storm Octave throughout its track

The 1980s saw destructive tropical cyclones pass through the state, as was the case with the previous decade.

- October 1983: A weather system, including moisture from Tropical Storm Octave, caused torrential rains over a ten-day period. The largest precipitation total occurred in Mount Graham, which saw 12.00 inches (305 mm) of rain overall. The downpour caused record floods in the San Francisco, Gila, San Pedro, and Santa Cruz rivers. The latter breached its banks near Red Rock, and by its intersection with Interstate 8, had flooded an area over 8 miles (13 km) wide. Fourteen people drowned, 975 were injured, and roughly 10,000 people were left homeless after the flooding ended. The amount of damage from the disaster was put at $370 million (year unknown) USD. Other cities in the state also saw heavy rain, with 9.83 inches (250 mm) of precipitation measured at Nogales, 6.67 inches (169 mm) at Safford, 6.40 inches (163 mm) at Tucson, 3.93 inches (100 mm) at Flagstaff, 2.65 inches (67 mm) at Phoenix, and 2.62 inches (67 mm) at Prescott.
- September 1984: Hurricane Norbert entered Arizona as a weakening tropical depression. Sustained winds of 20 to 30 miles per hour (30 to 50 km/h) were recorded in the Tucson area. Modest rainfall occurred throughout south-central to northeast Arizona, with most locations reporting between 1 and 2 inches (25 and 51 mm) of rain. However, Kitt Peak reported a 30-hour storm rainfall total of 4.15 inches (105 mm).
- October 1984: The following month, the remnants of Hurricane Polo caused about 1 inch (25 mm) of rain over southern and eastern Arizona, with Nogales reporting 1.93 inches (49 mm) of precipitation.
- October 1989: Flash flooding produced by Hurricane Raymond caused $1.5 million (1989 USD) in damage in the state. Raymond passed over Arizona as a tropical depression, and produced heavy rainfall on the southeastern portion of the state, with 4.72 inches (120 mm) of rain falling in Nogales. About three-quarters of the streets in Willcox were flooded in up to 2 feet (0.61 m) of water, and sustained winds of 25 to 35 mph (40 to 56 km/h) were reported throughout the southeastern corner of the state.

=== 1990s ===
During the 1990s, several tropical systems affected Arizona even after losing all tropical characteristics. However, two hurricanes survived long enough to reach Arizona while still considered tropical systems.

- June 1990: The moisture from Hurricane Boris produced 3.28 inches (83 mm) of rainfall on the Santa Rita Mountains.
- August 1990: The remnants of Hurricane Diana entered Arizona and quickly dissipated, though no rainfall was report throughout the state.
- August 1992: Hurricane Lester, reached the state as a tropical storm, and caused over 5 inches (130 mm) of precipitation near Phoenix and Tucson. The center of circulation of Lester passed near Tucson on August 24, producing sustained winds of 31 mph (50 km/h) at Tucson International Airport; the airport also reported gusts of up to 45 mph (72 km/h), and a drop in central barometric pressure to 999 mbar (29.52 inHg). Much of the rest of the state reported over 1 inch (25 mm) of rain as a result of Lester,. with a peak precipitation measurement of 5.5 inches (140 mm) at Cascabel.
- August 1993: Hilary's remnants caused flash flooding in Pima County after 3.75 inches (95 mm) of rain fell on Green Valley, and 3.50 inches (89 mm) of precipitation was recorded at Organ Pipe Cactus National Monument.
- August 1995: Flossie's remnants dumped over 3 inches (76 mm) of rain over Tucson; one woman died as she tried to cross a flooded stream, and 11 other motorists were stranded in the city. Damage from the storm in Arizona totaled to $5 million (1995 USD; $10.6 million 2026 USD).
- September 1995: That same year, Ismael produced most of its damage south of the state, but light rainfall fell over Cochise County, with the highest reported rainfall being 1.44 inches (37 mm).
- September 1997: Hurricane Nora, the second storm to reach the state while still retaining tropical characteristics, struck the state in late September and was responsible for the 24-hour rainfall record in the state. Nora produced 11.97 inches (304 mm) of rainfall over the Harquahala Mountains in Western Arizona, causing some flash flooding in the area. Near Phoenix, rainfall from the storm caused the Narrows Dam, a small earthen dam, to fail; localized rainfall amounts of up to 3 inches (76 mm) occurred throughout the state. Nora also caused 12,000 people to lose electric power in Yuma. Nora is believed to be the strongest tropical storm to strike Arizona, as it produced sustained winds of 50 to 60 mph (80 to 97 km/h) over Yuma. Nora caused $150–200 million (1997 USD) in agricultural losses in Arizona.
- August 1998: The remnants of Tropical Storm Frank produced up to 2 inches (51 mm) of rainfall in parts of the state.
- September 1998: The following month, Hurricane Isis's remnants dropped more than 2 inches (51 mm) of rainfall across southern Arizona, resulting in some flash flood warnings and flooding on roadways. Isis also caused up to 3 inches (76 mm) across the Santa Catalina and Rincon Mountains that surround Tucson. However, there was no flooding reported in the area, and Tucson International Airport reported only 1.1 inches (28 mm) as a result of the storm.

=== 2000s ===
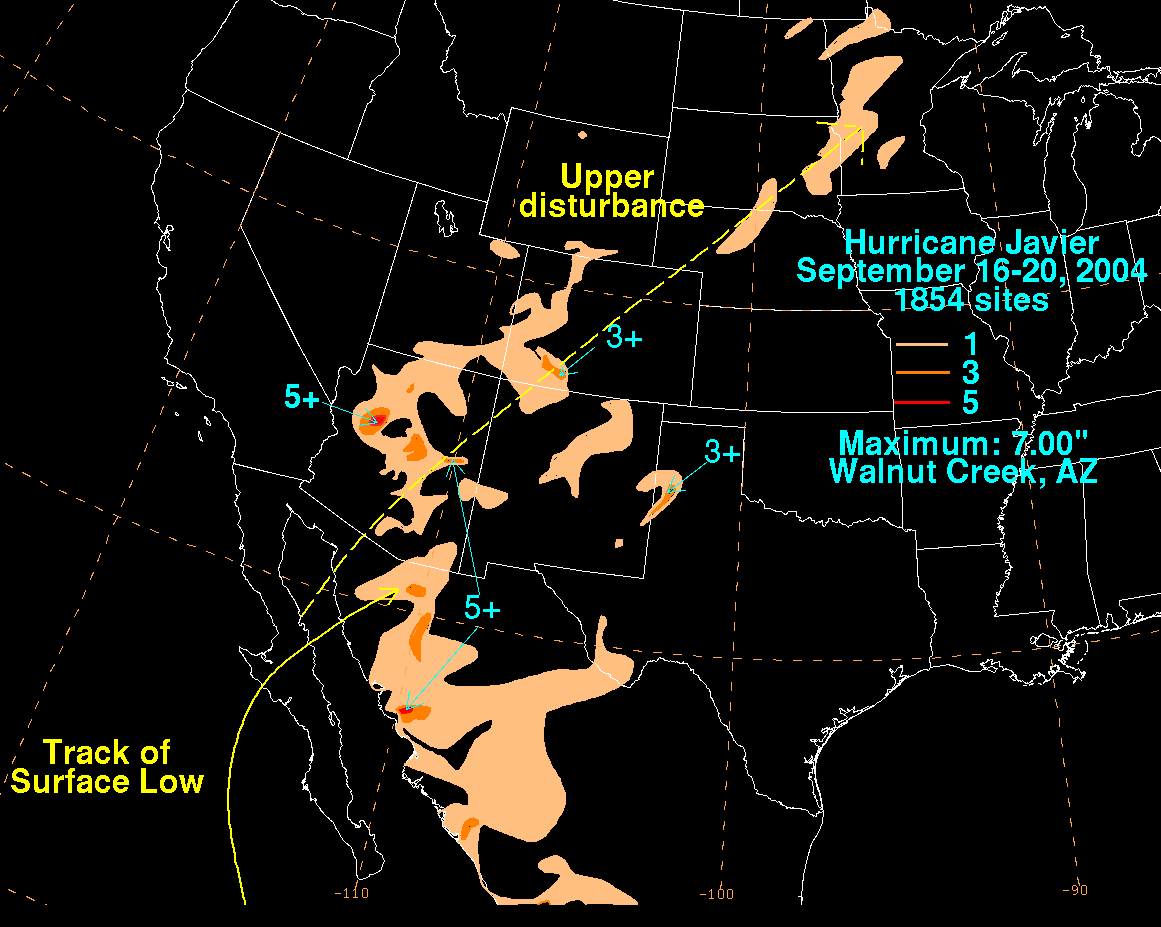
Hurricane Javier produced heavy precipitation in Arizona.

The last decade saw no storms reach Arizona while retaining tropical characteristics; however, numerous remnant lows caused heavy rainfall and flooding throughout the state.

- October 2000: The remnants of the first system, Tropical Storm Olivia, produced heavy flash floods in spite of Olivia losing tropical characteristics while located 600 miles (965 km) west-southwest of Cabo San Lucas, Baja California Sur. However, after being captured by an extratropical cyclone, the remnant low produced widespread heavy rains, with 1.5 to 4 inches (38 to 102 mm) of rain falling over most of southeastern Arizona; Hereford saw 8.64 inches (219 mm) of rain.
- October 2001: Hurricane Juliette dissipated in the Gulf of California, and brought only trace amounts of rainfall to the southern half of the state; the largest amount recorded occurred near Patagonia, where 0.90 inches (23 mm) fell.
- August 2003: Two years later, the remnants of Hurricane Ignacio produced rainfall over southern Arizona. About 40 residences in Catalina were evacuated due to the risk of flash flooding after 2 inches (51 mm) of rainfall fell over the Aspen Fire burn area.
- September 2003: That same year, Hurricane Marty brought locally heavy rains to extreme southwestern Arizona in September; in spite of this, there were no reports of flooding from the storm. The highest rain total was 2.83 inches (72 mm) at Organ Pipe Cactus National Monument.
- September 2004: Javier produced heavy rain throughout the state, helping to alleviate a prolonged drought in the Southwestern United States. The heaviest rainfall occurred at Walnut Creek, which saw a total of 7.00 inches (178 mm) of precipitation during the storm. The Tucson airport saw rainfall of 0.37 inches (9.4 mm), while the University of Arizona reported 0.89 inches (23 mm) of rain. The rain from Javier flooded several roads in the city and, combined with frequent lightning, forced the university to delay one of its football games.
- July 2006: The remnants of Tropical Storm Emilia produced an influx of tropical moisture over Arizona, triggering a week-long period of disturbed weather in late July. On July 25, a slow-moving severe thunderstorm dropped several inches of rainfall in a few hours, causing the closure of Interstate 19 when a wash flooded the roadway with running water 8 inches (200 mm) deep. The same storm also produced hail with a diameter of 1.75 inches (44 mm) north of Rio Rico, and 1 inch (25 mm) in Patagonia, and the size of a nickel in the Tohono Oʼodham Indian Reservation. The next day, another thunderstorm near Elfrida also produced 1-inch (25 mm) hail. After one week of widespread rainfall over southeastern Arizona, extensive flooding began to occur. Mount Lemmon saw a 7-day rainfall total of 11.10 inches (282 mm); Rillito Creek near the Catalina Mountains conveyed a record flow of 30,000 cu ft/s (850 m^{3}/s). Other streams in the area also saw record flooding, and the Santa Cruz River exceeded flood stage in Marana. The floods caused $4 million (2006 USD) in damage.
- September 2006: Hurricane John produced about 1 inch (25 mm) of rain over Cochise County.
- September 2007: Hurricane Henriette also produced flooding over Cochise County the following year; one woman died after trying to cross a flooded wash near Sierra Vista.
- July 2008: The remnants from Atlantic hurricane Hurricane Dolly caused rainfall in the eastern portion of the state, with 1.49 inches (38 mm) falling southwest of Portal.
- August 2008: Moisture from Tropical Storm Julio developed thunderstorms across Arizona, including one near Chandler which produced winds of 75 mph (120 km/h); the storm damaged ten small planes at Chandler Municipal Airport, as well as a hangar. The damages at the airport were estimated at $1 million (2008 USD). The storms also dropped heavy rainfall, reaching over 1 inch (25 mm) in Gilbert.
- September 2009: The remnants of Hurricane Jimena moved over Arizona on September 5. Near Walapai, water, rock, and other debris covered many roads. In addition, several power lines were down at the Bullhead City Airport. Golf ball-sized hail (1.75 inches (44 mm) in diameter) fell northwest of Golden Valley; a weather spotter's house received $5,000 in damage, with all of its windows broken and with damage to his weather station and radio equipment. In Riviera, southwest of Bullhead City, seven mobile home trails were blown with many other receiving some damage due to 80 mph (130 km/h) wind gusts. In the same area, four people were hurt and total damage was $500,000. North of Mohave Valley, mudslides caused two homes to be destroyed, with 9 others receiving moderate damage, and 16 other receiving minimal damage. Total damage was estimated to be at $600,000. In Laveen, 0.9 inches (23 mm) of precipitation fell in a 90-minute period. Heavy rain was recorded in Sedona, thus blocking traffic on State Route 179. in Prescott, street flooding was reported, closing State Route 69 and the Emerald Trail. In Quartzsite, washes overflowed their banks, causing street flooding, and $30,000 in damage. In Tanca, 1 inch (25 mm) of precipitation fell within a 30-minute period, thus causing minor flooding with one road being washed out. Damage from that flood totaled $30,000. Yuma also reported 1.62 inches (41 mm) of rain from the cyclone. On the afternoon of September 5, a haystack caught fire due to lighting, and was eventually responsible for an additional $20,000 in damage.

=== 2010s ===
- September 3, 2013: Moisture from the remnants of Tropical Storm Juliette fueled the monsoon across the southwestern United States, producing scattered showers and thunderstorms.
- September 8, 2014: The remnants of Hurricane Norbert produced record-breaking rainfall throughout the central portion of the state. Chandler received 6.09 in (155 mm) of precipitation, while Phoenix Sky Harbor Airport recorded 3.30 in (84 mm) of rainfall over a seven-hour period, breaking the 75‑year‑old daily rainfall record. It was also the highest precipitation at Sky Harbor in a single calendar day, but fell short of the station's 24‑hour rainfall total. Accumulations in Chandler and Mesa were deemed to be a 1-in-1,000 year event while Phoenix was calculated to be a 1-in-200 year event. Two women died, one in Pinal County and one in Tucson; both were swept away by floodwaters in their vehicles. Waters in Tucson reached as deep as 15 ft (4.6 m). Total damage in Maricopa and La Paz Counties amounted to $17.4 million.
- September 18, 2014: The remnants of Hurricane Odile brought heavy rainfall to southeastern Arizona.
- June 5, 2015: The remnants of Hurricane Andres brought thunderstorms to Arizona, with Phoenix having measurable precipitation on that day for the first time since records began in 1896.
- June 9, 2015: Just four days after Andres brought record-breaking rain to the Desert Southwest, another low-pressure system containing the remnants of Hurricane Blanca brought more record-breaking rainfall to many Arizona cities, including Tucson and Yuma.
- July 18, 2015: Some of Hurricane Dolores's moisture and remnants were directed into Arizona, bringing showers and thunderstorms. Up to 1 inch of rain was recorded in some places. The heavy rain triggered some flash floods and mudslides near Phoenix.
- October 1–2, 2018: Hurricane Rosa which at that time was a tropical storm approaching Baja California, left massive rainfall within these two days. More than 2 inches of rain was recorded in some places. Many places were covered with water, some flash floods.

=== 2020s ===
- August 18–22, 2023: Hurricane Hilary's remnants triggered heavy rainfall, peaking at 2.10 inches (53 mm) at Hilltop.
- June 1–4, 2025: Remnant moisture from Tropical Storm Alvin brought severe thunderstorms to portions of the state.
- October 9-10, 2025- The remnants of Hurricane Priscilla brought rain to Arizona.
- October 12-13, 2025- The remnants of Tropical Storm Raymond hits in Arizona brought rain, and also Tempe got an microburst storm.
- October 11, 2026 - The remnants of Hurricane Rachel impacts the state, with flood warnings and high wind warnings in Flagstaff and other areas.

== See also ==
- List of Pacific hurricane records
- List of California hurricanes
- List of New Mexico hurricanes
- List of the wettest tropical cyclones in the United States
