= List of New Mexico hurricanes =

Satellite loop of the remnants of Tropical Storm Georgette in 2010 affecting New Mexico

The landlocked U.S. state of New Mexico has experienced impacts from 81 known tropical cyclones and their remnants. There have been 68 known tropical cyclones from the Eastern Pacific that affected the state, compared to only 13 such Atlantic hurricanes. The biggest threat from such storms in the state is their associated rainfall and flooding. The wettest storm was from the remnants of an Atlantic storm in 1941 that produced 11.33 in (288 mm) of precipitation. Since 1950, the highest rainfall total recorded was 9.8 in (250 mm) in Canton, also associated with an Atlantic storm in 1954. The rains in 1954 resulted in flooding in six towns that killed at least four people. Other deadly rainfall events from tropical cyclone remnants include Hurricane Dolly in 2008 and Tropical Storm Georgette in 2010. The former swept away a person along the Rio Ruidoso and caused $25 million in damage (2008 USD), which was the most damaging storm event. The floods damaged 500 buildings and destroyed 13 bridges. The latter caused heavy rains that resulted in one death in the Rio Grande.

== Climatology ==
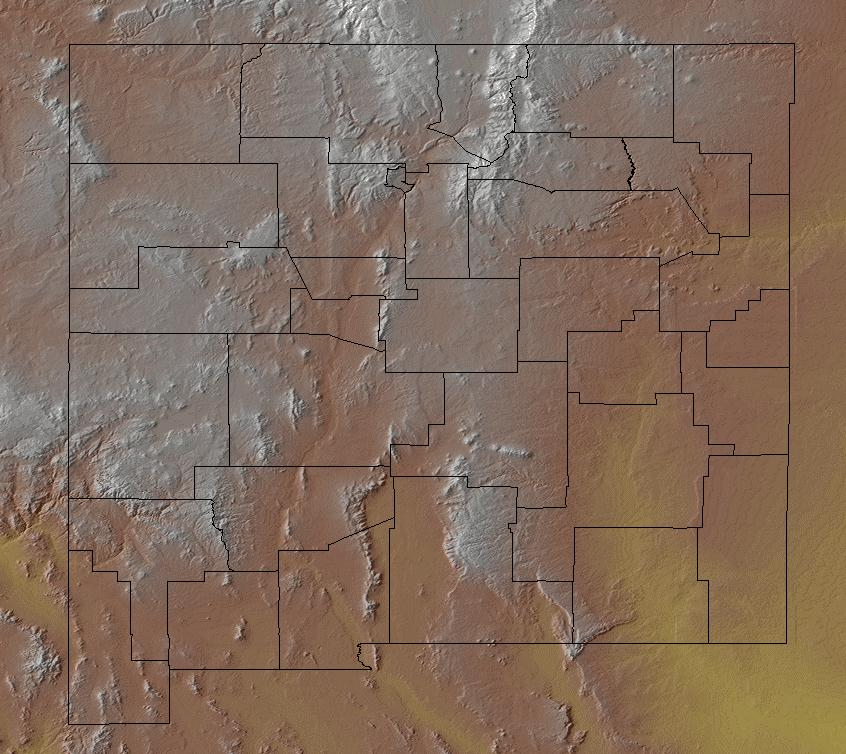
Topographical map of New Mexico

Due to New Mexico's position in the southwestern United States, there are three primary causes for flooding within the state in the autumn months: the effects of tropical cyclones, the North American Monsoon, or an approaching cold front. Tropical cyclones from both the Atlantic and Pacific oceans can affect New Mexico, usually in southern regions. Storms that originate from the Atlantic Ocean usually move through the Gulf of Mexico on a northwest trajectory, typically during the month of September. Tropical cyclones from the eastern Pacific usually maintain a fast north-northeast track, occasionally through the Gulf of California, and generally affect the state from the middle of September to the middle of October. The accompanying moisture of the Pacific storms encounter the mountains of the state, and through orographic lift, produce heavy rainfall. Due to the storms' fast movement, the rainfall events accompanying Pacific storms are generally shorter lasting and more concentrated than other such storms in the state.

In an average year, the remnants of 3.1 Pacific tropical cyclones affect the southwestern United States. In some locations, the systems provide 30% of the annual rainfall. In New Mexico, however, stations' annual rainfall from tropical cyclones range from 10% in the western portion to less than 5% in the eastern. Rainfall from tropical cyclones affect the Albuquerque International Sunport an average of 3.9 days per year. Storms affect New Mexico less than Arizona, and are generally weaker. The greatest threat from such storms are accompanying floods. Damage from tropical cyclones is expected to increase as the population increases in the southwestern United States.

== List of storms ==
=== Before 1950 ===
- October 4, 1911 – Influenced by an approaching extratropical cyclone, the remnants of a tropical cyclone crossed the Gulf of California and Arizona into New Mexico, producing 2 in (51 mm) of rain in some areas.
- September 18, 1918 – The remnants of a Pacific hurricane moved through the northern portion of the state.
- September 16, 1919 – After striking Texas as a hurricane, a tropical depression dissipated over western Texas. Its remnants produced 2.84 in (72 mm) of rainfall in Roswell.
- October 1, 1921 – The remnants of a Pacific hurricane moved through the northern portion of the state.
- August 27, 1932 – A landfalling storm near Culiacán, Sinaloa produced heavy rainfall in the southwestern New Mexico for three days.
- September 8, 1936 – After moving through the Sea of Cortez into Arizona, the remnants of a tropical cyclone dropped 1.97 in (50 mm) in Datil.
- September 2, 1938 – The remnants of a Pacific storm produced rainfall in the state.
- September 18, 1941 – The remnants of an Atlantic storm dropped 11.33 in (288 mm) of rainfall in a 24‑hour period.
- August 31, 1942 – A hurricane struck Texas and dissipated over southern New Mexico, producing 9 in (230 mm) of rain in 28 hours. The rainfall caused flooding in the Pecos and Canadian rivers. In one station along the Pecos River, the floods produced a discharge of 48,600 cubic feet per second (0.028 cubic meters per second), which was a 1 in 100 year event.

=== 1950s ===
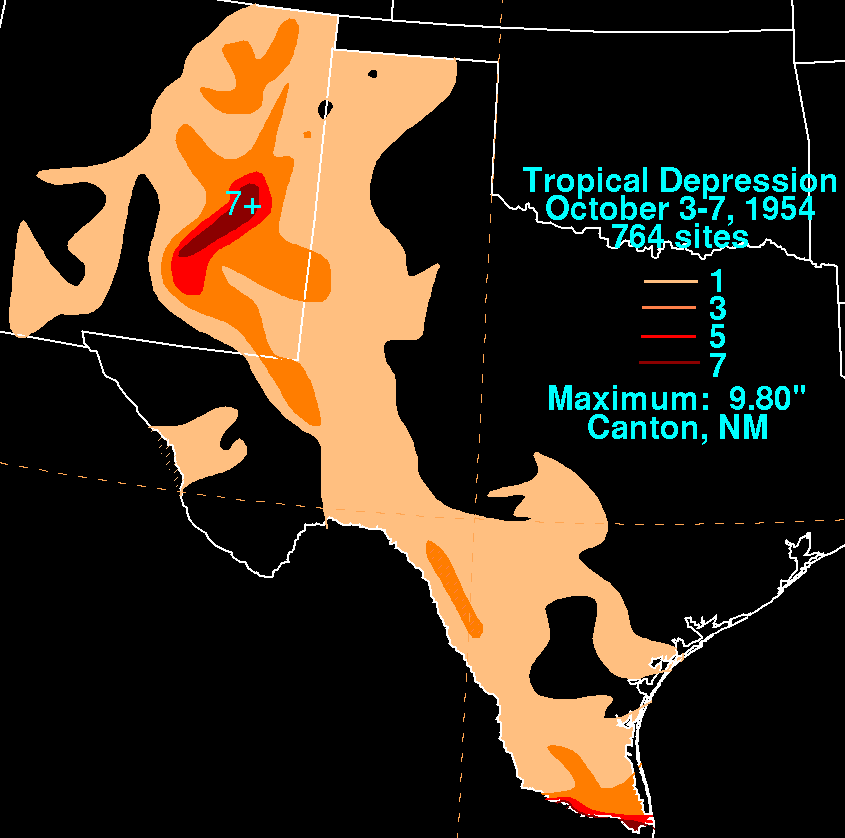
Rainfall summary for a tropical depression in 1954

- 1951 – The remnants of a Pacific tropical cyclone affected the state.
- October 7, 1954 – Rains subsided from a tropical depression that crossed from Texas into New Mexico. The highest precipitation was 9.8 in (250 mm) in Canton, which was the greatest rainfall total associated with a tropical cyclone in the state since 1950. The rainfall caused flooding in Roswell and along the Pecos River system. The flooding caused millions in damage after flooding affected six towns and highways across the region. There were four confirmed fatalities with seven missing in the days after the storm.
- 1954 – In addition to the previous storm, the remnants of a Pacific tropical cyclone affected the state.
- October 6, 1957 – After crossing northwestern Mexico, a tropical depression dissipated in the southern portion of the state.
- 1957 – In addition to the previous storm, the remnants of another Pacific system affected the state.
- September 12, 1958 – A tropical storm dissipated over Baja California, spreading rainfall into the state.
- October 6, 1958 – A tropical depression from the Pacific dissipated over the state, after crossing Sonora and Arizona. This was exactly a year after another depression dissipated in the state. The depression produced rainfall in the state.
- 1959–1961 – The Albuquerque National Weather Service reported that the remnants of a Pacific storm affected the state in each of the years.

=== 1960s ===
- September 27, 1962 – Tropical Storm Claudia dissipated over the Baja California peninsula and produced over 25% of the warm-season rainfall in portions of New Mexico. The remnants of another storm in the year also affected the state.
- 1964–1967 – The Albuquerque National Weather Service reported that the remnants of a Pacific storm affected the state in each of the years.
- August 20, 1968 – The remnants of Tropical Storm Hyacinth spread into the state with thunderstorms and light rainfall.
- October 3, 1968 – Portions of the state experienced rainfall from dissipating Hurricane Pauline.
- In addition to the previous two systems, the remnants of a third storm affected the state. According to the Albuquerque National Weather Service, 1968 had the most storms affecting the state.

=== 1970s ===
- August 5, 1970 – Tropical Depression Celia maintained a well-defined circulation until it dissipated over the southeast portion of the state, after causing heavy damage in southeastern Texas. The system dropped over 2 in (51 mm) of rainfall in some areas, but its associated winds were not strong.
- September 5, 1970 – Moisture from Tropical Storm Norma from the Pacific combined with a cold front to produce heavy rainfall of about 12 in (300 mm), causing flooding near the Four Corners region.
- October 1, 1971 – The remnants of Hurricane Olivia dropped 2.23 in (57 mm) in Zuni.
- October 7, 1972 – Tropical Depression Joanne dissipated over northwestern Mexico, producing 2.48 in (63 mm) in Albuquerque.
- October 2, 1976 – Hurricane Liza struck northwestern Mexico and dissipated, although its remnants dropped light rain in the state that reached 0.47 in (12 mm) in White Sands National Monument.
- August 18, 1977 – As Tropical Depression Doreen dissipated near California, its outskirts produced 2.05 in (52 mm) of rainfall in the city of Florida.
- October 7, 1977 – Hurricane Heather dissipated to the west of Baja California. Its remnants spread rainfall across the southwest United States, including a statewide peak of 3.17 in (81 mm) near Yeso.
- September 1978 – The remnants of a Pacific tropical cyclone dropped at least 6.35 in (161 mm) in the Guadalupe Mountains in the southeast portion of the state.

=== 1980s ===
- August 12, 1980 – After making landfall near the mouth of the Rio Grande, Hurricane Allen dissipated near the Texas/New Mexico border. The storm produced rainfall across the state.
- July 30, 1981 – The remnant circulation of a tropical depression from the Atlantic dissipated over northern Texas. Its moisture extended into New Mexico, and 6.12 in (155 mm) fell at Hobbs.
- October 1, 1982 – Heavy rainfall of over 4 in (100 mm) spread across the state after Hurricane Paul struck Baja California and dissipated. The rains caused crop and property damage.
- October 2, 1983 – Tropical Storm Octave stayed offshore western Mexico, but contributed to widespread flooding and rainfall across the southwestern United States. Rainfall in New Mexico reached 5.42 in (138 mm) near Luna. The rains caused flooding that forced people from their homes and damaged a portion of U.S. Route 180. New Mexico governor Toney Anaya declared a state of emergency in Catron County.
- October 19, 1983 – The remnants of Hurricane Tico dropped over 3 in (76 mm) of rainfall in the southeastern portion of the state.
- September 26, 1984 – Flash flood warnings were posted across the state due to rainfall from the remnants of Hurricane Norbert.
- October 3, 1984 – The remnants of Hurricane Polo dropped about 2 in (51 mm) of rain in Reserve.
- October 9, 1985 – Flash floods affected the southern one–third of the state from rainfall associated with the remnants of Hurricane Waldo. The hurricane previously dissipated over Mexico, and the resulting floods was due to heavy rainfall that peaked at 6.66 in (169 mm) in Hobbs. Damage was estimated between $100,000–$1 million (1985 USD), mostly to crops, roads, and buildings.
- September 24, 1986 – The remnants of Hurricane Newton crossed the southeastern portion of the state with scattered rainshowers. Rainfall peaked at 1.31 in (33 mm) southeast of Lordsburg.
- October 13, 1987 – Moisture from Hurricane Ramon from the Pacific spread into the state.
- 1988 – The Albuquerque National Weather Service reported that the remnants of one of the eastern Pacific tropical cyclones affected the state.
- October 5, 1989 – Tropical Depression Raymond entered the state from Arizona and dissipated in the western portion of the state. The storm produced about 1 in (25 mm) of rain across the region, peaking at 2.99 in (76 mm) in Red River.

=== 1990s ===
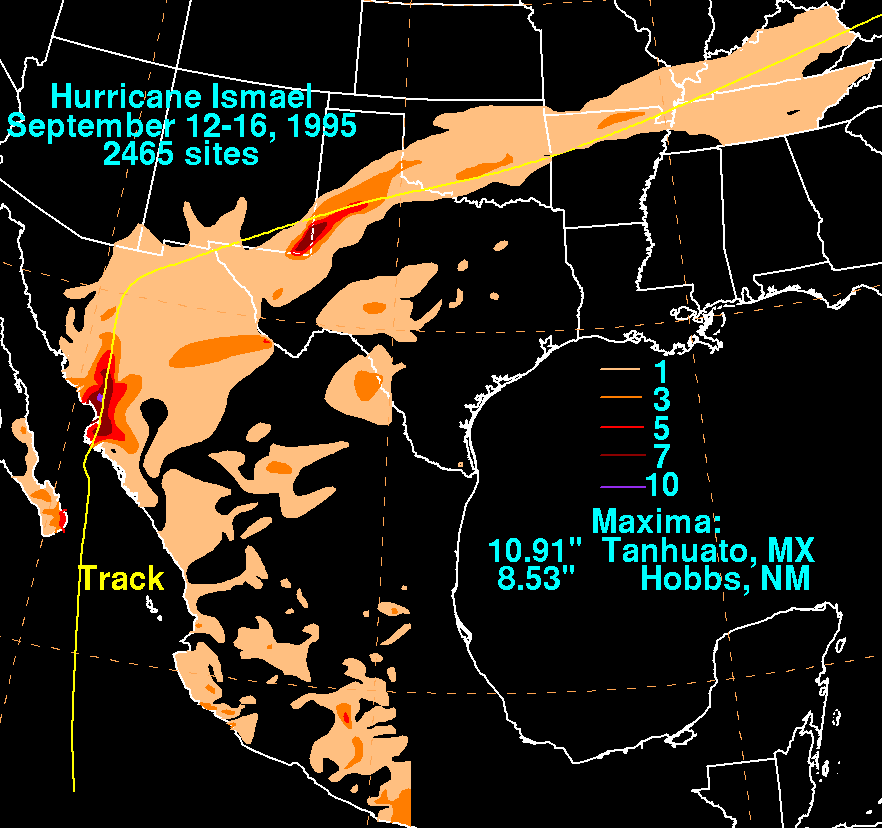
Rainfall map for Hurricane Ismael

- June 1990 – The remnants of Hurricane Boris from the eastern Pacific dropped 0.92 in (23 mm) of rainfall in Wolf Canyon.
- June 1990 – Moisture from Tropical Storm Douglas brought substantial rainfall to the state.
- October 1, 1990 – In an area already experiencing above-normal rainfall, the remnants of Tropical Storm Rachel produced additional precipitation in the state.
- August 24, 1992 – Tropical Depression Lester moved into the state from Arizona and dissipated near Albuquerque. The highest rainfall total was 2.17 in (55 mm) near Lindrith. The rains caused flash flooding of arroyos and a mudslide along U.S. Route 180.
- August 27, 1993 – Tropical Depression Hilary dissipated over northwestern Mexico before producing a surge of moisture that dropped over 25% of the summer rainfall in portions of the state.
- September 15, 1995 – The remnants of Hurricane Ismael dropped 8.53 in (217 mm) of rainfall in Hobbs, with unofficial reports of over 10 in (250 mm). The intense precipitation flooded many houses and closed several roads. Flooding also washed out three sections of the Texas – New Mexico Railroad line. Damage was estimated at $250,000 (1995 USD).
- September 14, 1996 – Hurricane Fausto dissipated over Mexico, and its remnant moisture contributed to rainfall and flash floods. Portions of Black River Village reported 2 ft (0.61 m) of flooding.
- September 26, 1997 – No impacts were reported in the state after Hurricane Nora moved more west than forecast, however, it left twice the normal amount of moisture in the air over the four-corners area which eventually condensed into rain-producing clouds.
- August 11, 1998 – Moisture from Tropical Storm Frank spread from the coast of California through New Mexico.
- September 1998 – The remnants of Hurricane Isis produced 1.47 in (37 mm) of precipitation at White Signal.

=== 2000s ===
Satellite image of the remnants of Hurricane Dolly entering New Mexico

- October 11, 2000 – The remnants of Tropical Storm Olivia from the Pacific dropped heavy rainfall in the northwestern portion of the state.
- September 30, 2001 – Moisture from Tropical Depression Juliette spread across the state.
- September 9, 2002 – Rainfall and thunderstorms spread across the state in association with Tropical Storm Fay dissipating over Texas.
- July 16, 2003 – The remnants of Hurricane Claudette from the Atlantic produced beneficial rainfall in the southeastern portion of the state.
- September 24, 2003 – Rains from Tropical Depression Marty in the Sea of Cortez spread across the southwestern United States, including 1.06 in (27 mm) near Glenwood.
- October 7, 2003 – A stalled extratropical storm drew moisture from hurricanes Nora and Olaf to produce rains in a drought-stricken region, along with flash flooding.
- July 3, 2004 – Moisture from a tropical depression produced a few thunderstorms in the state.
- September 21, 2004 – The mid-level remnants of Hurricane Javier crossed the northwest portion of the state from the eastern Pacific, dropping 2.48 in (63 mm) of rainfall in Albuquerque.
- July 22, 2005 – For four days, the remnants of Hurricane Emily from the Atlantic Ocean produced thunderstorms across the state.
- September 22, 2005 – Thunderstorms were reported across the state in association with the remnants of Hurricane Max.
- October 2, 2005 – Moisture from the remnants of Hurricane Otis in the Pacific Ocean produced scattered thunderstorms.
- September 2, 2006 – The remnants of Hurricane John from the eastern Pacific produced three days of rainfall in the southern portion of the state. The moisture was amplified by an approaching upper-level trough. Ruidoso reported the highest rainfall total with 5.25 in (133 mm). The precipitation flooded creeks and rivers, which entered houses and caused roads to close.
- August 17, 2007 – The outskirts of Tropical Depression Erin, having earlier struck Texas, brushed eastern New Mexico.
- August 26, 2007 – Moisture from the remnants of Hurricane Dean moved across the western portion of the state.
- September 6, 2007 – The remnants of Hurricane Henriette produced rainfall in the southwestern portion of the state. The system spawned a landspout near Tyrone.
- July 26, 2008 – The well-defined circulation of former Hurricane Dolly crossed Texas and eastern Mexico into southeastern New Mexico. Rainfall totals included a statewide peak of 8.53 in (217 mm) in Sunspot, and more than 6 in (150 mm) Ruidoso. The high totals caused the Rio Ruidoso and Rio Bonito to overflow near Ruidoso, which resulted in flooding in and around the city. One person died after being swept away by the Rio Ruidoso. Flooding near Mescalero caused two dams to fail at Mud Canyon. The system also spawned a funnel cloud near Las Cruces. Across the region, the flooding caused about $25 million in damage after damaging about 500 structures, including 47 destroyed houses. The floods also washed out at least 13 bridges.
- September 11, 2008 – The remnants of Tropical Storm Lowell from the eastern Pacific produced flash flooding near Hobbs. Remnant moisture also contributed to the development of an EF0 tornado, which touched down near Vaughn.
- October 11, 2008 – After making landfall in western Mexico, Hurricane Norbert produced rainfall and thunderstorms across New Mexico after combining with a powerful storm moving through the Great Basin. The rainfall reached 1.5 in (38 mm) in House, and the thunderstorms caused tree damage and dropped large hail.
- September 2, 2009 – While striking Baja California, Hurricane Jimena spread rainfall into portions of the state.

=== 2010s ===
- July 2010 – Dissipating Hurricane Alex dropped over 3 in (75 mm) of rainfall in the southeast portion of the state.
- September 22, 2010 – Moisture from the remnants of Tropical Storm Georgette in the eastern Pacific combined with an approaching upper-level trough to produce heavy rainfall and thunderstorms across the state. A total of 6.42 in (163 mm) was reported in Gladstone. The rains caused flooding that killed a person along the Rio Grande near Carnuel.
- September 28, 2012 – The remnants of Hurricane Miriam dropped rainfall in the southeastern portion of the state.
- September 17, 2014 – The remnants of Hurricane Norbert caused significant damage to New Mexico Highway 152. Due to the severity of damage, the New Mexico Department of Transportation closed the road indefinitely and stated it could be more than a month until it was re-opened.
- September 18–20, 2014 – The remnants of Hurricane Odile brought heavy rainfall to southwestern New Mexico. Floods from the remnants killed one oil field worker.
- June 5, 2015 – The remnants of Hurricane Andres brought rain to northern New Mexico.
- September 5, 2015 – Moisture drawn northeast from Tropical Storm Kevin brought scattered storms to the Four Corners region.
- September 7, 2016 – The remnants of Hurricane Newton brought very heavy rains to western and central New Mexico.

=== 2020s ===
- September 29, 2026 - The renmants of Hurricane Polo bring flooding to wide swaths of the state.

== Climatological statistics ==
Number of recorded storms affecting New Mexico
| Month | Number of storms |
|---|---|
| June | 3 |
| July | 6 |
| August | 11 |
| September | 29 |
| October | 22 |

Number of recorded storms affecting New Mexico
| Period | Number of storms |
|---|---|
| 1910s | 3 |
| 1920s | 1 |
| 1930s | 3 |
| 1940s | 2 |
| 1950s | 8 |
| 1960s | 10 |
| 1970s | 8 |
| 1980s | 12 |
| 1990s | 9 |
| 2000–2009 | 19 |
| 2010s | 7 |

== See also ==
- List of United States hurricanes
