= Hurricane Heather =

1977 Pacific hurricane

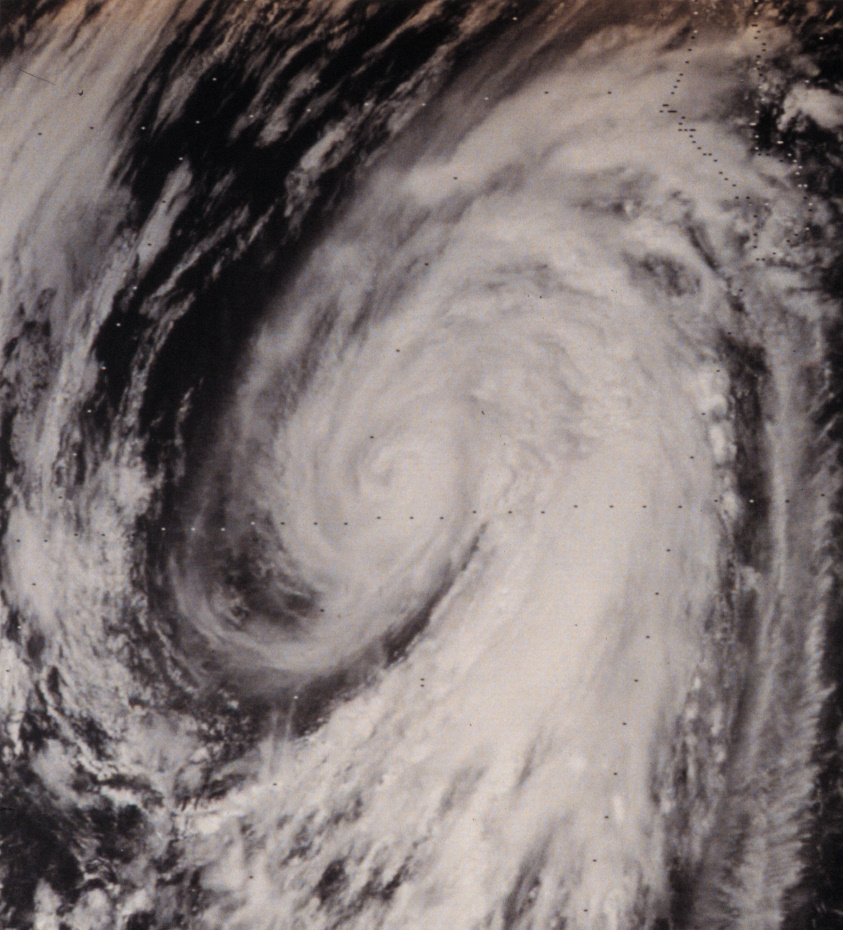
- Heather at peak intensity on October 5

Meteorological history
- Formed: October 4, 1977
- Dissipated: October 7, 1977

Category 1 hurricane
- 1-minute sustained (SSHWS/NWS)
- Highest winds: 85 mph (140 km/h)
- Lowest pressure: 978 mbar (hPa); 28.88 inHg

Overall effects
- Casualties: None reported
- Damage: $15 million (1977 USD)
- Areas affected: Socorro Island, Arizona, California, New Mexico, Sonora
- IBTrACS
- Part of the 1977 Pacific hurricane season

Hurricane Heather was one of the worst tropical cyclones to affect Arizona on record. The sixteenth tropical cyclone, eighth named storm, and fourth hurricane of the 1977 Pacific hurricane season, it began as a tropical disturbance off the west coast of Mexico on October 3. The next day, October 4, it developed into a tropical depression and then turned to the northwest. It was soon upgraded to Tropical Storm Heather. On October 5, Heather became a hurricane, and later that day its winds peaked at 85 mph (137 km/h). Heather began to turn north-northwest around this time. By October 6, it was re-designated a tropical storm. Moving north, Heather continued to weaken over cooler waters, and on October 7, the final advisory was issued, downgrading Heather to a tropical depression.

Heather's remnants later brought heavy rains to southeast Arizona and far northern parts of Sonora from October 6–10, causing severe flooding. Rain totals as high as 14 inches (360 mm) were recorded in unspecified areas in this region, and the city of Nogales in Arizona officially recorded 8.30 inches (211 mm) of rain from the storm. The normally dry Santa Cruz River flooded several cities and towns along its path, reaching up to a 100-year flood stage near Nogales. Hundreds of people were driven from their homes due to flooding from Heather. Overall, the storm caused $15 million (1977 USD) in damage, primarily to agriculture, but caused no injuries or fatalities.

== Meteorological history ==
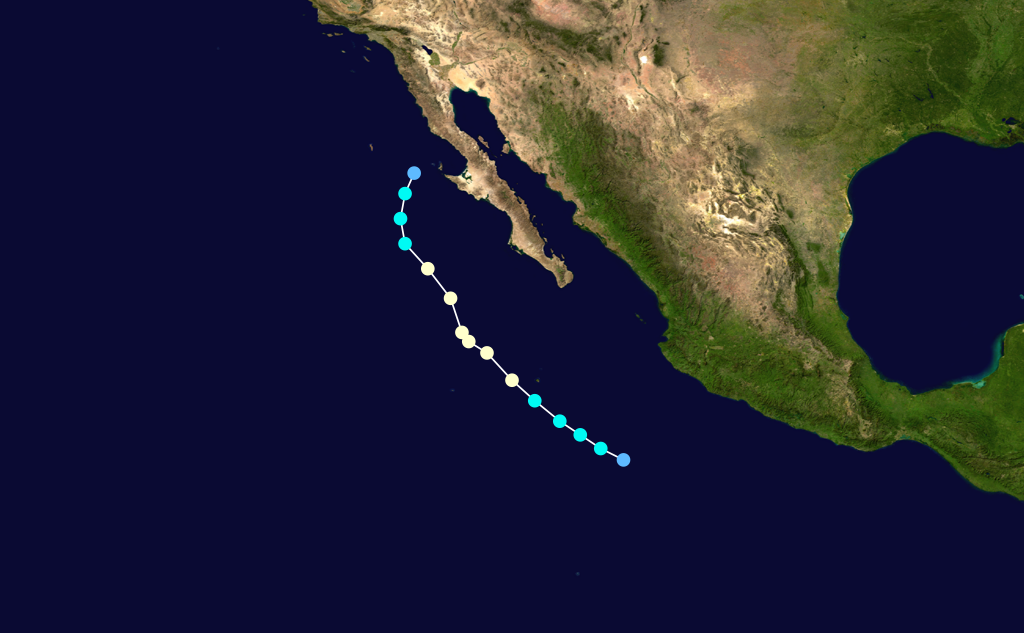
Map plotting the storm's track and intensity, according to the Saffir–Simpson scale Map key Saffir–Simpson scale Tropical depression (≤38 mph, ≤62 km/h) Tropical storm (39–73 mph, 63–118 km/h) Category 1 (74–95 mph, 119–153 km/h) Category 2 (96–110 mph, 154–177 km/h) Category 3 (111–129 mph, 178–208 km/h) Category 4 (130–156 mph, 209–251 km/h) Category 5 (≥157 mph, ≥252 km/h) Unknown Storm type Tropical cyclone Subtropical cyclone Extratropical cyclone, remnant low, tropical disturbance, or monsoon depression

Heather began as a tropical disturbance, roughly 300 miles (480 km) south-southwest of Manzanillo, at 18:00 UTC on October 3. Moving west-northwest at about 14 mph (23 km/h), the disturbance intensified over sea surface temperatures (SSTs) of 84 °F (29 °C), and was upgraded to Tropical Depression Sixteen at 00:00 UTC on October 4. The depression turned to the northwest, and six hours later was upgraded to Tropical Storm Heather. Heather continued to intensify, and by 06:00 UTC on October 5, Heather was upgraded to a hurricane while 70 miles west of Socorro Island; the storm brought 60 mph (97 km/h) winds to the island at this time.

At 12:00 UTC on October 5, Heather reached peak winds of 85 mph (137 km/h), while about 165 mi (265 km) west-northwest of Socorro Island. A NOAA reconnaissance aircraft estimated a sea-level pressure of 978 millibars (28.9 inHg) at 21:00 UTC, the lowest recorded in relation to the storm. After this point, Heather began to weaken after moving north-northwest over colder SSTs. Heather fell to tropical storm status late on October 6, while about 285 mi (460 km) west of Isla Magdalena. Heather continued to weaken after turning north over waters as cool as 72 °F (22 °C), and satellite imagery showed the storm's upper and lower circulations separating by about 140 mi (230 km). The final advisory on Heather was issued at 06:00 UTC on October 7, downgrading Heather to a tropical depression that was rapidly dissipating. Heather's remnants collided with a cold front on October 8 or 9, which became nearly stationary south of Nogales around this time for 24–36 hours, before weakening and moving east on October 10.

== Impact ==
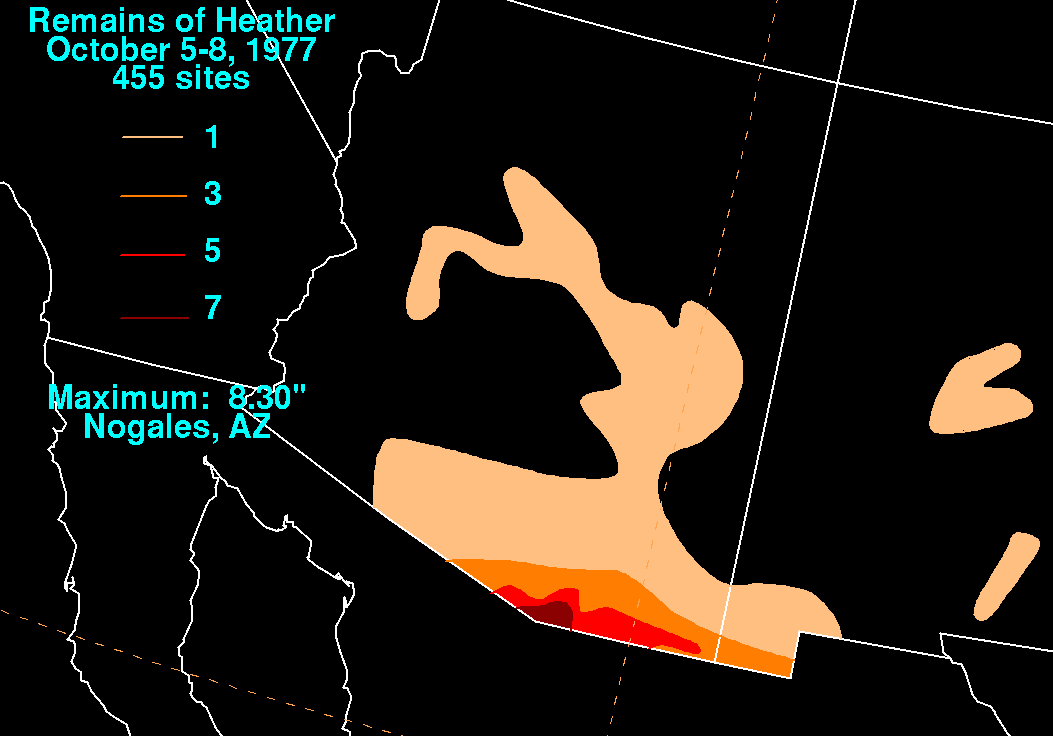
Rainfall summary for Hurricane Heather

Total damage from the storm was at least $15 million, with approximately $9 million of that coming in the Tucson, Arizona area; the city of Tucson itself lost $2.7 million, with about $1 million being lost at a sewage treatment plant. About $9 million of the damage was agriculture-related; $4.7 million of that came in the Tucson area, and an additional $3.2 million came in Santa Cruz County in Arizona. Another $4 million in damage was related to transportation; at least $1 million came from the Tucson area, where four roads crossing the dry riverbed of the Santa Cruz River outside city limits and another four roads crossing the Santa Cruz within city limits were damaged. The other $2 million was in damage to businesses, residential areas, and utilities. No injuries or fatalities were reported as a result of the storm. At least 90 homes flooded, mostly near Nogales, Arizona.

=== Arizona ===
Heather's remnants produced heavy rainfall in southeast Arizona from October 6–10. A flash flood watch was put in place for the majority of Arizona on October 6, which included all of Arizona outside of Mohave County by early October 7. Flash flood warnings were in place for parts of Arizona later on October 7, and remained in place in southeast Arizona on October 8. The warnings were ultimately lifted on October 9 during the evening in eastern Pima, Cochise, and Santa Cruz counties. The heaviest impacts came in Nogales, where at least 8.30 inches (211 mm) of rain fell in 4 days, though unofficial reports in some parts of the city indicated up to 12 inches (300 mm) of rain fell. Residents of the city were urged to conserve and boil water, after wells became unusable due to mud. Approximately 600 people, including 170 families, were evacuated in Nogales, with an estimate of 100 more people evacuated downstream along the San Pedro River. Reports of 10–14 inches (250–360 mm) of rainfall were recorded in unspecified areas of the mountains near Nogales and across the border in far northern Mexico.

The normally dry Santa Cruz River reached a 50-year flood stage near Tucson, and over a 100-year flood stage between Nogales and Continental; the river rose three feet (0.91 m) in five minutes in Nogales, cresting shortly after this time. The river also reached its highest known discharge at the time upstream of Tucson, and reached its highest level since records for the river began in 1915, at 17 feet (5.2 m). A 1-in-35 year flood event occurred along the Santa Cruz in Marana on October 10. Tucson had an inch of rain fall in one hour on October 6. As a result of the floods, a bridge leading to the Mount Hopkins Observatory collapsed, and several more bridges over the Santa Cruz River were damaged due to the flooding. In addition, flooding washed out a bridge on Interstate 19 between Tucson and Nogales, closing the interstate. A freight railway connecting the two cities had several bridges washed out and was flooded. The typically dry San Pedro and Gila rivers also flooded; the former's flood was considered severe. The town of Winkelman had one bridge wash out, and another just outside the town on Arizona State Route 177 was shut down; twenty people had to leave their homes due to flooding in the town. Riverside, Arizona was disconnected from the rest of the state when the bridge leading to the town was flooded; twenty families were evacuated from the town, and roughly 150 people moved uphill to escape floodwaters. Rio Rico had 700 families stranded after the access road leading to the town was flooded. The National Guard debated evacuating residents of Kino Springs, though this turned out to be unnecessary when the storm calmed down. Along the Santa Cruz, 15,600 acres of farmland were inundated in Santa Cruz and Pima counties.

=== Elsewhere ===
Parts of southern California received up to two inches (51 mm) of rain. Minor crop damage occurred around the city of Tulare, where roughly 1,000 electricity customers lost power; most of the customers had power back within 20 minutes. A flash flood watch was put in place along the coastal areas of San Diego and Riverside counties in California. The Yeso 2 S weather station outside of Yeso, New Mexico recorded 3.17 in (81 mm) of rain, the highest total in the state. In a period of six hours on October 6, the Cannon Air Force Base outside Clovis, New Mexico received 1.26 in (32 mm) of rain, while Albuquerque received .73 in (19 mm) of rain in a 24-hour period. Parts of south and southwest Colorado and west and central New Mexico had flash flood watches issued by October 7; later that day, some were upgraded to warnings.

Parts of the mountains of far northern Sonora, Mexico, along with areas just north across the border into Arizona, reportedly received somewhere between 10 and 14 inches (250 and 360 mm) of rain from Heather. An unknown number of people in Nogales, Sonora were told to move to higher ground. In Hermosillo and surrounding areas, roughly 100 families were left homeless after flash floods from the storm. The village of Cibuta had 45 families evacuated, while 40 more were evacuated from Agua Zarca. Another 20 families, trapped by the Cibuta River, were rescued by a helicopter sent by Arizona Governor Raúl Héctor Castro. Over 98,000 acres of cotton crops were damaged by rains from Heather in Mexico.

== Aftermath ==
Governor Castro declared Santa Cruz County a disaster area. By October 12, Castro had declared a proclamation of emergency for the counties of Santa Cruz, Pima and Pinal. The Santa Cruz County Red Cross set up a relief program after the storm, which provided free food, clothing, shelter and medical care to victims of the storm. On October 20, Wesley Bolin was sworn in as the new governor of Arizona and requested president Jimmy Carter to declare Santa Cruz, Pima, and Pinal counties major disaster areas after the storm; six days later, he requested $11.3 million in flood relief from Carter. Pima County itself requested $1.8 million in flood relief; it got approximately $1.3 million in August 1978. The Arizona State Emergency Council authorized $250,000 to be used for repairs of "essential public facilities", along with $50,000 that had been approved for emergency repairs on October 9 by Castro.

Multiple bridges in Pima County were expected to take up to two months to be repaired to a point where they could be used. The Camino del Cerro bridge in Tucson was originally expected to take between three months and $75,000–150,000 for building a similar bridge, or up to seven months and $800,000 if they built a completely different bridge. The bridge ultimately ended up costing $870,000 to complete; $600,000 of the funds were supplied by the federal government. The new bridge opened in November 1979.

== See also ==
- Tropical Storm Norma (1970) – Killed 23 people in Arizona
- Hurricane Kathleen (1976) – Brought record rainfall to California a year prior
- Hurricane Doreen (1977) – Caused heavy flooding in California earlier in 1977
- Tropical Storm Octave (1983) – Considered the worst tropical cyclone on record in Arizona
- Hurricane Nora (1997) – Reached Arizona as a tropical storm and caused record precipitation
- Hurricane Norbert (2014) – Remnants of the storm caused catastrophic flooding in Arizona
- List of Arizona hurricanes
- List of wettest tropical cyclones in Arizona
