= Tropical Storm Octave (1983) =

Pacific tropical storm in 1983

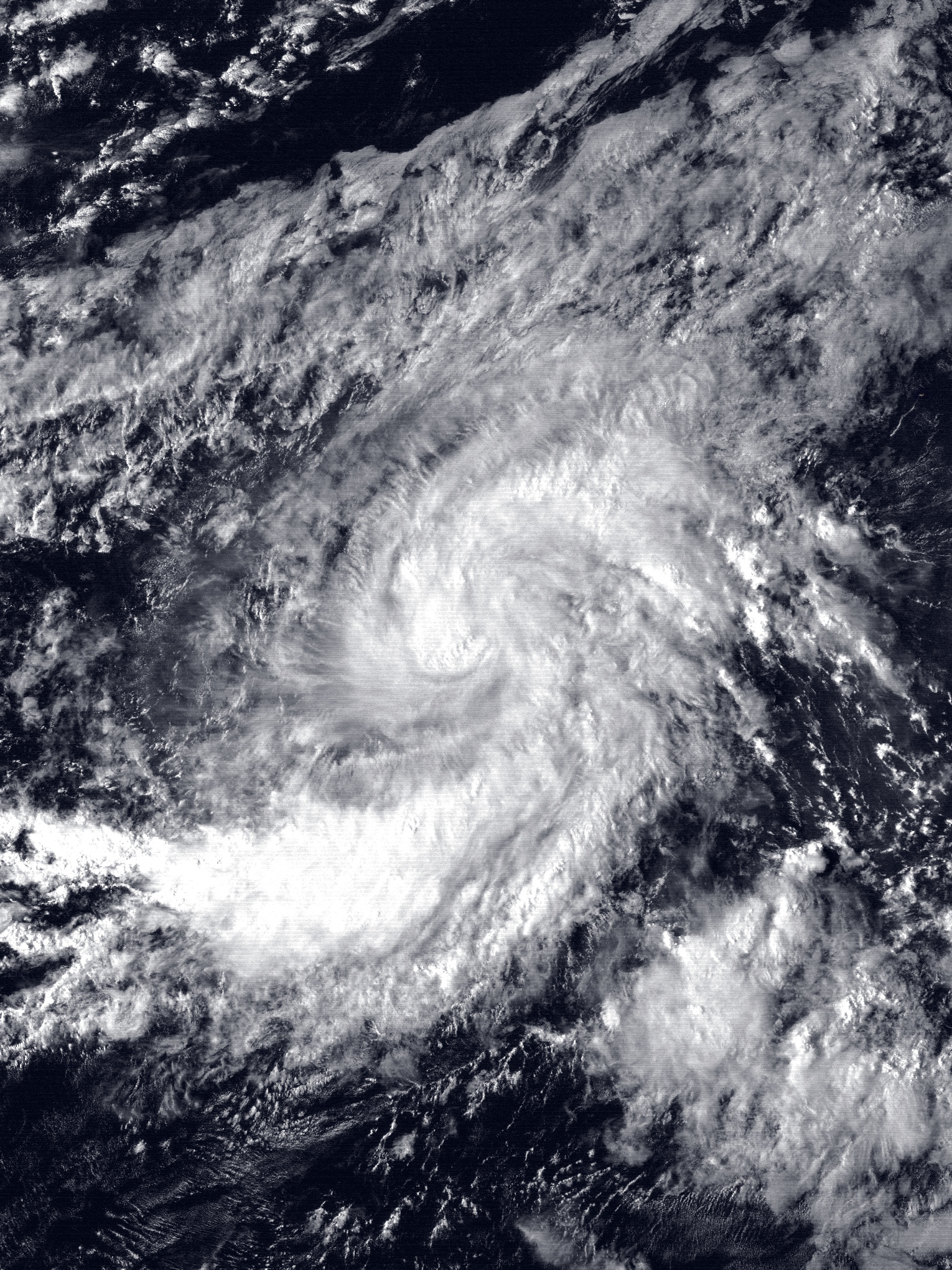
- Tropical Storm Octave at peak intensity on September 28

Meteorological history
- Formed: September 27, 1983
- Dissipated: October 2, 1983

Tropical storm
- 1-minute sustained (SSHWS/NWS)
- Highest winds: 50 mph (85 km/h)

Overall effects
- Fatalities: 14
- Injuries: 975
- Damage: $513 million
- Areas affected: Arizona, New Mexico, Mexico
- IBTrACS
- Part of the 1983 Pacific hurricane season

Tropical Storm Octave was considered the worst tropical cyclone in the history of Arizona. The nineteenth tropical cyclone and fifteenth named storm of the 1983 Pacific hurricane season, the origins of Tropical Storm Octave were from a tropical disturbance that formed south of the Gulf of Tehuantepec on September 23, 1983. Steered by a deep layer high over Mexico, the disturbance moved west for four days before becoming a tropical depression on September 27 off the southwest coast of Mexico. Over an area of warm sea surface temperatures, it was able to quickly strengthen to peak winds of 50 mph (85 km/h), through wind shear prevented much further development. By September 30, Octave was accelerating to the northeast, steadily weakening due to cooler waters. That day it weakened to tropical depression status, and on October 2, Octave dissipated.

In Arizona, the highest rainfall total was 12.0 in (300 mm) at Mount Graham. In Tucson, flood waters were reportedly 8 ft (2.4 m) high. Throughout the state, excessive rainfall caused many rivers to overflow. After the rain ended, the Santa Cruz, Rillito, and Gila rivers experienced their highest crests on record. Five towns – Clifton, Duncan, Winkelman, Hayden, and Marana – were almost completely flooded. In Marana, many homes were submerged, forcing residents to be evacuated. Over 700 homes were destroyed in Clifton. In addition, 86 of the town's 126 business were heavily damaged due to the flooding. Around 3,000 buildings were destroyed due to Octave. A total of 853 houses, mobile homes, and apartments were destroyed while 2,052 others were damaged. About 10,000 people were temporarily left homeless. Damage in Arizona totaled $500 million (1983 USD), which was above the preliminary estimate of $300 million. Fourteen people drowned and 975 persons were injured. Elsewhere, Octave was responsible for $12.5 million in damage in New Mexico. Following the storm, governor Bruce Babbitt declared a state of emergency. President Ronald Reagan declared Cochise, Gila, Graham, Greenlee, Pima, Pinal, Santa Cruz and Yavapai counties a "major disaster area".

== Background ==
Well before the start of the rainfall, much of Arizona had been affected by a wet winter and subsequent monsoon season leaving the grounds saturated and susceptible to flooding. Moreover, the months of August and September had been very wet months for most of the Southwestern United States. In fact, it had rained almost every other day at many weather stations in Arizona. The remnants of a Pacific hurricane brought rain to much of California and part of Arizona. Then, on September 22, the North American Monsoon became active over the region. This was atypical for late September; by this time, in a normal year the climate is dry. However, in late September 1983, surface weather maps exhibited a few unusual features. A thermal low lay over the mouth of the Gulf of California while the tail end of a weak cold front was located atop of the Great Basin. On September 28, moisture from the storm began spreading across Mexico and the southwest United States, due to a stalled low pressure area off the coast of California drawing the thunderstorms northeastward. Tropical Storm Octave played a vital role in the disaster by supplying warm, moisture to the region, which collided with cooler air from the subtropics. By October 2, the heaviest rainfall had ended.

== Meteorological history ==
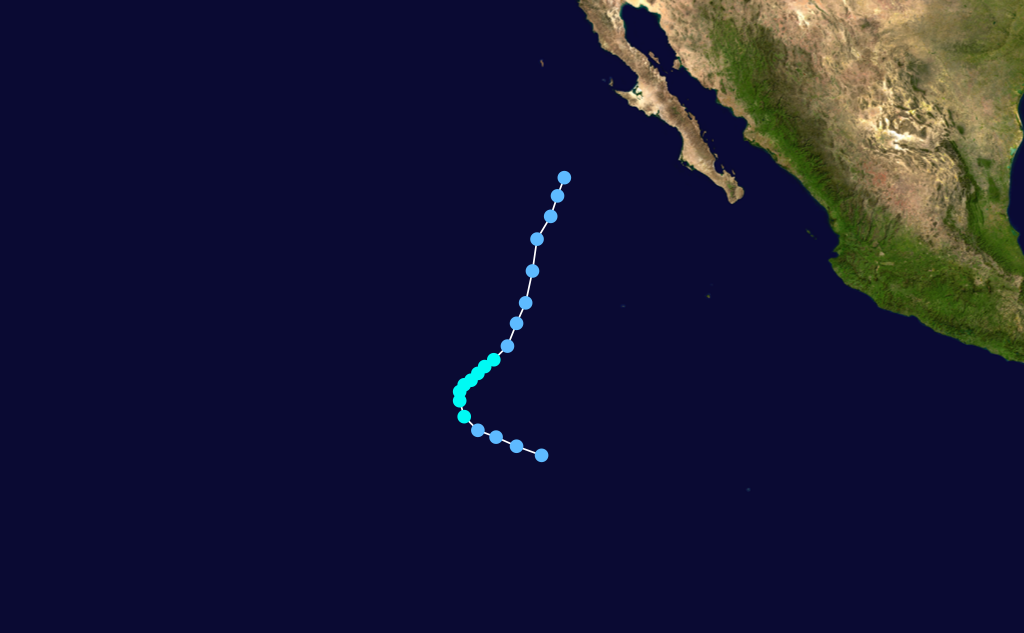
Map plotting the storm's track and intensity, according to the Saffir–Simpson scale Map key Saffir–Simpson scale Tropical depression (≤38 mph, ≤62 km/h) Tropical storm (39–73 mph, 63–118 km/h) Category 1 (74–95 mph, 119–153 km/h) Category 2 (96–110 mph, 154–177 km/h) Category 3 (111–129 mph, 178–208 km/h) Category 4 (130–156 mph, 209–251 km/h) Category 5 (≥157 mph, ≥252 km/h) Unknown Storm type Tropical cyclone Subtropical cyclone Extratropical cyclone, remnant low, tropical disturbance, or monsoon depression

A tropical disturbance formed south of the Gulf of Tehuantepec on September 23. Steered by a deep layer high over Mexico, the disturbance moved west for four days before attaining tropical depression status. Upon becoming a tropical cyclone the depression was situated over warm waters; however, wind shear subsequently increased in the vicinity of the storm. Therefore, significant development was impeded as the depression curved back to the north along an adjacent upper-level low.

As conditions aloft turned favorable by September 28, the depression strengthened into Tropical Storm Octave at 1800 UTC that day. Within six hours, Octave attained its peak intensity of 50 mph (80 km/h) and decreased in forward speed while turning to the northeast. On September 30, Octave began to accelerate towards the northeast as it began to weaken due to cooler waters and increasing vertical wind shear. Consequently, the winds gradually decreased to 35 mph (55 km/h) and the storm was downgraded back to tropical depression status during the afternoon. At 1200 UTC on October 2, the EPHC issued their last advisory on the storm as the surface circulation had dissipated.

== Preparations ==
Due to the threat for flooding, local flood warnings were issued for much of Arizona. Starting at 0100 UTC on September 30 and lasting until 0600 UTC on October 6, the Tucson National Weather Service office issued 20 warnings and statements including 13 radar-generated updates. In the same time period, the Phoenix National Weather Service office issued 28 warnings, watches, and statements, nine of which were flood warnings generated by the Joint Federal-State Flood Warning Office. Although several flood warnings from the Phoenix National Weather Service Office were requested to be broadcast via the Emergency Broadcast System (EBS), which is a national program that provides public warning for such disasters, no warnings were implemented. The reason was that time there was no formal EBS program active in the Tucson area, and there was only one program request to fill this gap, but that request was denied. The Pima County Emergency Services Director stated that "we just didn't see the need for activating the EBS system." Despite the lack of EBS broadcasts, NOAA Weather Radio claims it did the best it could to provide updated information on Octave.

== Impact ==
The rainfall event lasted for one week, from September 28 to October 4.

=== Arizona ===
Already inundated by previous rains, additional rainfall moved over the area; much of the state of Arizona was deluged with 6 in (150 mm) of precipitation in a mere two days. Early on September 28, moisture related to Octave began to fall in northern Santa Cruz County, eastern Pima County, and in portions of Tucson. In the end, the highest rainfall associated with the event was 12.0 in (300 mm) at Mount Graham. Elsewhere, Nogales recorded 9.83 in (250 mm); portions of Tucson received over 8 in (200 mm), and Mount Lemmon experienced 10.45 in (265 mm). In addition to the rain, winds of 32 mph (51 km/h) were measured.

In Tucson, flood waters reportedly reached 8 ft (2.4 m), stranding hundreds of people on rooftops. Throughout the state, excessive rainfall caused many rivers to overflow. Water was released from the Coolidge Dam, which forced 75 residents to evacuate, marking the third time in 50 years that water was released from the dam. After a third bout of heavy rain on October 2, the Santa Cruz, Rillito, and Gila rivers experienced their highest crests on record. A flow rate of 25,000 ft^{3} (707,921,165 cc) per second was measured in the Rillito river; the Santa Cruz river peaked at a flow rate of 1,490 m^{3} (52,620 ft^{3}), which was short of the record set during Hurricane Heather during the 1977 Pacific hurricane season. All other rivers that pass through Tucson did not attain record levels and were significantly lower than past flood episodes.

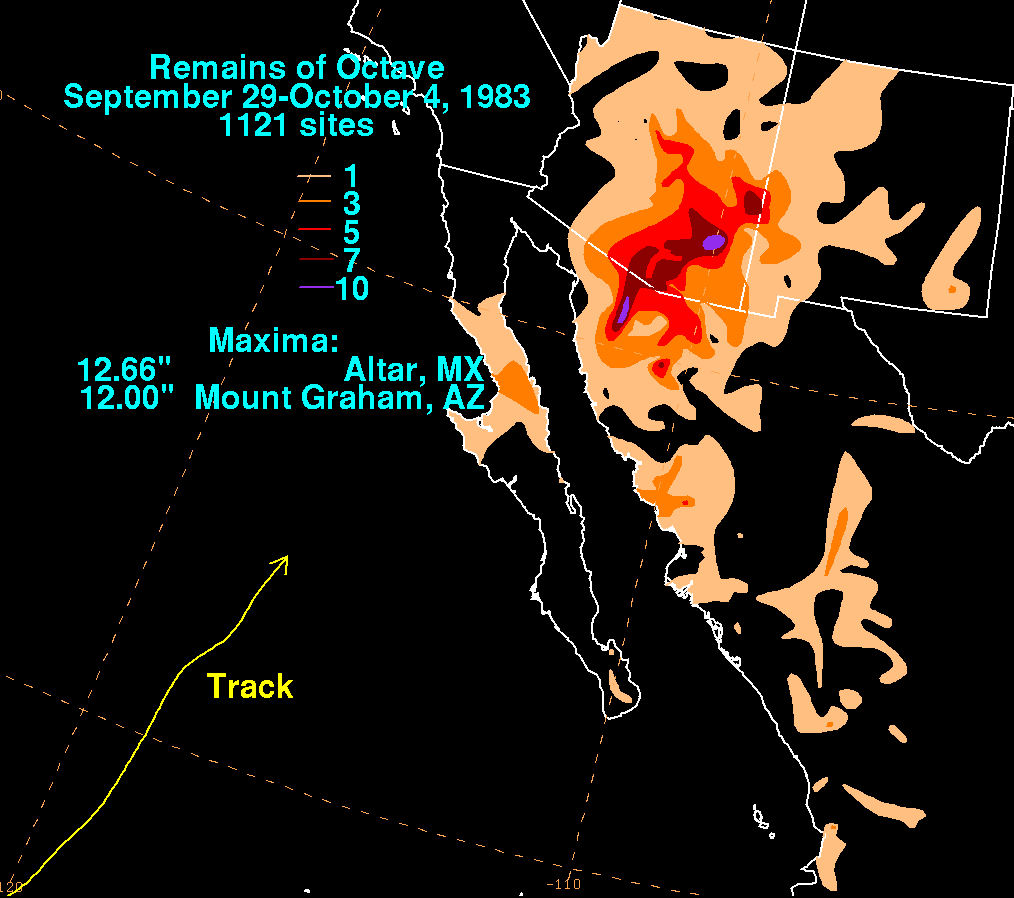
Rainfall totals in Mexico and the southwest United States

As Tropical Storm Octave deluged the state, the Rillito River slowly eroded its banks, and by October 2, the river had widened 100 ft (30 m), destroying a parking lot and an office building. Runoff from both the Rillito and Santa Cruz rivers eventually piled up in a delta, flooding Marana. In Marana, many homes were submerged, forcing residents to be evacuated. Only two town residents had flood insurance because officials "didn't believe a flood could occur there." Additionally, communities along the Santa Cruz River were flooded, forcing 4,000 residents to evacuate their homes, many of whom lost key property possessions. The metropolitan area of Tucson was completely flooded due to the storm.

Tropical Storm Octave also caused major flooding along the Gila River, which reached its highest discharge rates since 1906. and two of its tributaries, the San Francisco River and the San Pedro River. These rains devastated Clifton along the San Francisco River valley. Most of Clifton's 4,200 residents had to be evacuated due to flooding, where over 700 homes were destroyed. In addition, 86 of the town's 126 businesses were heavily damaged due to the floods. The Gila River near Clifton sustained its largest discharge rates since Clifton was founded. Along the Southern Francisco River, a peak discharge rate of 56,000 ft^{3} (1.6×10^{9} cc) was reported by meteorologists, which is 1.8 times greater than the previous record set by Hurricane Joanne during the 1972 Pacific hurricane season.

Further south along the Gila River, major flooding was reported in extreme southeastern Arizona, where Octave was described as the worst flood in the area's history since 1916. In Willcox, a farming community 80 mi (130 km) east of Tucson, residents armed with shovels and sandbags fought rising floodwaters after the Hooker Dam, an earthen dam 35 mi (55 km) north of Willcox, burst, preventing further destruction. The cities of Nogales and Tubac, near the Mexican border, was without power and water for two days following the storm.

The Mohave and Yavapai counties were particularly hard-hit. A relief helicopter crashed in attempt to rescue a woman and her baby, killing its two crew members. Five towns – Clifton, Duncan, Winkelman, Hayden, and Marana – were all almost entirely flooded. Authorities were forced to close Interstate 10 when waters from the Gila River destroyed a bridge. Additionally, two people perished in their car on an Indian reservation in the Gila River valley. Nearby, in Phoenix, 150 persons were evacuated from an apartment complex. One underpass was filled with water 9 ft (2.7 m) deep. Throughout the greater Phoenix area, eight fires were started via lightning. Damage from the fires totaled $90,000. In all, 14 injuries were reported. The 28 mile (45 km) long Santa Fe Railway that served the city of Prescott was washed out in multiple locations between the Chino Valley and downtown Prescott due to floodwaters. Railroad service was never reinstituted and the line was formally abandoned in 1984, leaving Prescott as Arizona's largest city ever to lose its rail service.

Extensive damage was reported throughout the state. About one-seventh of the cotton crop was destroyed by Octave. Much of the rich topsoil was washed downstream into large reservoirs. Furthermore, agriculture damage totaled about $97.5 million. Damage to homes totaled $17 million while damages to business exceeded $6 million in damage. Public property damage reached $55.7 million. A father, mother, and two children were swept off their truck in Ash Fork. Two navy officers where killed on September 30 near Oatman when their jet crashed. On October 1, a man drowned in the Santa Cruz river. Another person drowned in a wash near Tucson when his truck stalled. In addition, a taxi driver and a passenger died when tried to cross a flooded river.

Overall, infrastructural damage estimates in the Tucson area ranged from $54–100 million; damage to roads and highways alone surpassed $10 million in Tucson. Tropical Storm Octave was very similar to Tropical Storm Norma in terms of flood damage. Octave was also described as the "Storm of the Century" and a 100-year flood. The system is considered the cause of the worst flood in Pima County history. It is also regarded as the worst tropical system to affect Arizona.

Around 3,000 buildings were destroyed due to Octave. A total of 853 houses, mobile homes, and apartments were destroyed by Octave while 2,052 others were damaged. About 10,000 people were temporarily left homeless. Damage in Arizona totaled $500 million, which was above the preliminary estimate of $300 million. Fourteen people drowned and 975 persons were injured.

=== Elsewhere ===
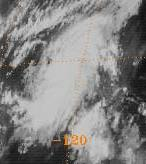
Octave south of Baja California.

In New Mexico, a peak total of 5.31 in (135 mm) of rain was recorded. In that state, the rainfall also caused flooding that forced people from their homes and damaged a portion of U.S. Route 180; New Mexico governor Toney Anaya declared a state of emergency in Catron County. Damage to four flooded counties in southwest New Mexico was estimated at $12.5 million, including $6.5 million worth of damage to levees and dikes. Damage to highways also totaled $1.5 million.

Further west, rainfall was also reported in California. In Mexico, 12 in (300 mm) of precipitation was reported in Altar, while lighter totals between 1–3 in (25–75 mm) were reported along the Baja California Peninsula. In Sonora, many roads near the border were closed, and a lack of food supply was reported. Along the Mexican Riviera, there were isolated reports of 1 in (25 mm) of precipitation.

== Aftermath ==
On October 3, Governor Bruce Babbitt declared a state of emergency. Concerns arose regarding the state of several areas and possible disruptions in the delivery of food and other supplies. President Ronald Reagan declared Arizona counties Cochise, Gila, Graham, Greenlee, Pima, Pinal, Santa Cruz and Yavapai a "major disaster area" on October 5. About $650,000 worth of government aid was provided to victims of Octave. Babbitt also toured the devastated area. Officials also opened 15 shelters, which housed 2,905 people.

Many workers from dozens of companies used cranes, dynamite, trucks, and hammers to clean up dried 7 ft (2.1 m) mud near some rivers. Many destroyed buildings were later rebuilt. Considerable experience was also gained on how to protect flood banks. Repair costs from Octave totaled $60 million. It is estimated that it took four months for floodwaters to recede across southeastern Arizona and portions of New Mexico.

== See also ==
- Other storms of the same name
- List of Arizona hurricanes
- Floods in the United States: 1901–2000
- Timeline of the 1983 Pacific hurricane season
- List of New Mexico hurricanes
- Hurricane Nora (1997)
- Tropical Storm Norma (1970)
- Hurricane Joanne (1972)
