= List of storms named Octave =

The name Octave has been used for six tropical cyclones in the Eastern Pacific Ocean.

- Tropical Storm Octave (1983) – a moderately strong tropical storm that caused catastrophic flooding in Arizona
- Hurricane Octave (1989) – a Category 4 major hurricane off the coast of Mexico
- Hurricane Octave (2001) – a Category 1 hurricane which became the last named storm of the season
- Tropical Storm Octave (2013) – a strong tropical storm which caused minimal damage in Baja California
- Tropical Storm Octave (2019) – minimal tropical storm that stayed out to sea
- Hurricane Octave (2025) – a long-lived Category 1 hurricane that stayed out to sea
