= Hurricane Norbert (2014) =

Category 3 Pacific hurricane in 2014

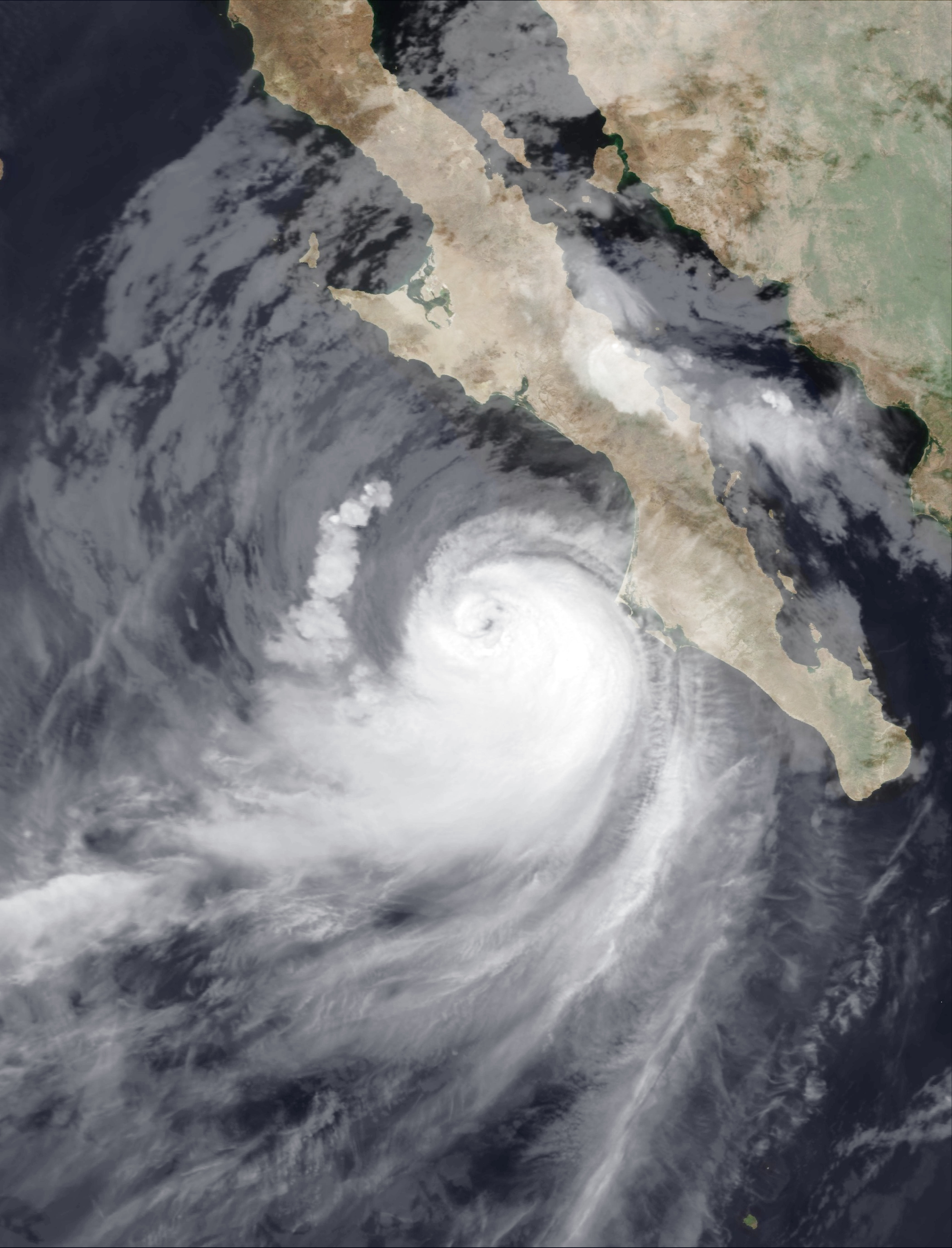
- Hurricane Norbert shortly after its peak intensity off the Baja California Peninsula on September 6

Meteorological history
- Formed: September 2, 2014
- Remnant low: September 8, 2014
- Dissipated: September 11, 2014

Category 3 major hurricane
- 1-minute sustained (SSHWS/NWS)
- Highest winds: 125 mph (205 km/h)
- Lowest pressure: 950 mbar (hPa); 28.05 inHg

Overall effects
- Fatalities: 5 total
- Damage: $28.3 million (2014 USD)
- Areas affected: Western Mexico, Baja California Peninsula, Southwestern United States
- IBTrACS
- Part of the 2014 Pacific hurricane season

Hurricane Norbert produced a 1-in-1,000 year rainfall event in Arizona in early September 2014. The fifteenth named storm, tenth hurricane, and seventh major hurricane of the 2014 Pacific hurricane season, Norbert originated from an area of disturbed weather in association with an area of low pressure on September 2. Tracking generally northwestward, the newly designated tropical storm steadily organized in a moderate shear environment. Norbert attained hurricane intensity early on September 4 and Category 2 hurricane strength the next afternoon. Thereafter, the cyclone began a period of rapid deepening, and it subsequently attained its peak intensity with winds of 125 mph (201 km/h) and a minimum pressure of 950 mbar (950 hPa; 28 inHg) early on September 6. A track over progressively cooler waters and into a more stable environment prompted a weakening trend after peak intensity, and by early on September 8, the system no longer maintained enough convection to be considered a tropical cyclone.

== Meteorological history ==
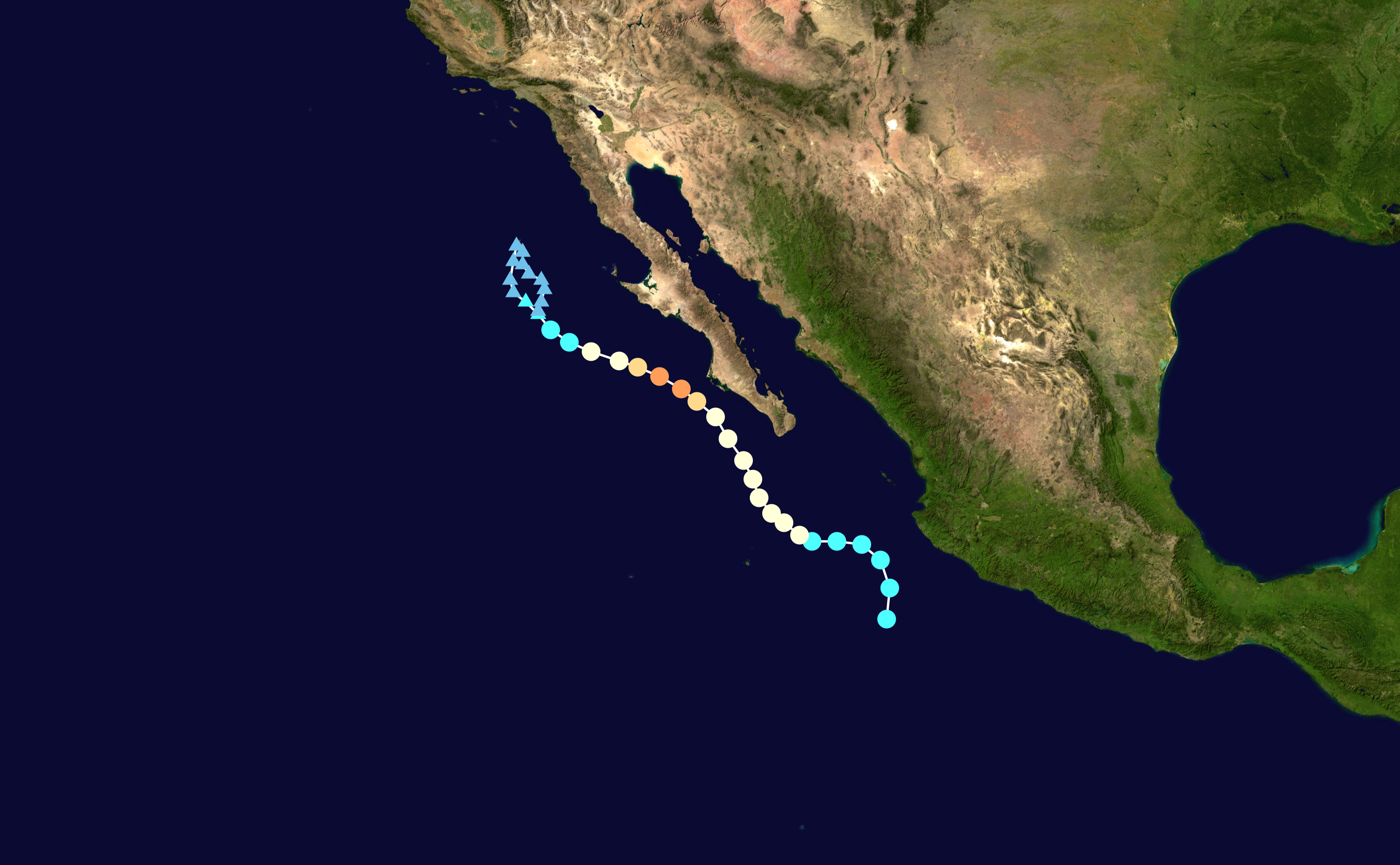
Map plotting the storm's track and intensity, according to the Saffir–Simpson scale Map key Saffir–Simpson scale Tropical depression (≤38 mph, ≤62 km/h) Tropical storm (39–73 mph, 63–118 km/h) Category 1 (74–95 mph, 119–153 km/h) Category 2 (96–110 mph, 154–177 km/h) Category 3 (111–129 mph, 178–208 km/h) Category 4 (130–156 mph, 209–251 km/h) Category 5 (≥157 mph, ≥252 km/h) Unknown Storm type Tropical cyclone Subtropical cyclone Extratropical cyclone, remnant low, tropical disturbance, or monsoon depression

On August 30, the National Hurricane Center (NHC) indicated the potential for an area of low pressure to form offshore the coastline of Mexico and slowly develop over subsequent days. This projection came to fruition the next afternoon, when a large area of showers and thunderstorms in association with a trough of low pressure was noted. Amid a generally favorable environment with moderate wind shear and warm sea surface temperatures, convection steadily coalesced atop a distinct low-level circulation, and the disturbance acquired enough organization to be deemed a tropical cyclone at 15:00 UTC on September 2; it was designated Tropical Storm Norbert in accordance with an Advanced Scatterometer (ASCAT) pass. Due to moderate northeasterly wind shear, only modest intensification was predicted. Norbert moved generally northwestward succeeding formation, steered around the southwestern periphery of a subtropical ridge across Baja California and northern Mexico. All the while, the cloud pattern of the cyclone progressively improved, with a symmetric central dense overcast and distinct rainbands on convectional satellite, and a formative inner core with hints of a small mid-level eye on hurricane imagery. In conjunction with satellite intensity estimates, Norbert was upgraded to a Category 1 hurricane on September 4.

Tropical Storms Norbert (left) and Dolly (right) straddling both coasts of Mexico on September 2

Continuing on a general northwestward trajectory, increased easterly wind shear caused the system to temporarily lose organization during the pre-dawn hours of September 4 as the low- and mid-level circulations became dislocated. An Air Force Reserve Hurricane Hunter aircraft investigated Norbert that afternoon, recording peak flight-level winds of 97 mph (156 km/h), maximum surface winds of 90 mph (140 km/h), and a minimum barometric pressure of 970 mbar (970 hPa; 29 inHg). Early on September 6, the cyclone began a period of unexpected rapid deepening; at 00:00 UTC, it was upgraded to a Category 2 hurricane, and at 06:00 UTC, it intensified a major hurricane, a Category 3 hurricane on the Saffir-Simpson Hurricane Wind Scale. After attaining its peak intensity with maximum winds of 125 mph (201 km/h) and a minimum pressure of 950 mbar (950 hPa; 28 inHg), Norbert began to track over cooler sea surface temperatures, and a weakening trend ensued. It was downgraded to a Category 2 hurricane at 21:00 UTC on September 6, and further to a Category 1 hurricane at 03:00 UTC the next day. Deep convection associated with Norbert began to wane significantly as the storm entered a stable environment, and a blend of satellite intensity estimates prompted the NHC to downgrade it to a tropical storm at 15:00 UTC. At 09:00 UTC on September 8, after having been devoid of deep, organized convection for over 12 hours, the system was declared a post-tropical cyclone. During the next few days, Nobert's remnants made a northward loop, before dissipating on September 11.

== Preparations ==
Despite remaining well offshore the Mexican coast, classes in Manzanillo were suspended for a day. A "yellow" (moderate) alert was activated for Sinaloa, Nayarit, and Jalisco. Elsewhere, an "orange" (high) alert was issued for Soccoro Island, San Benedicto Island, and Baja California Sur. The southern portions of the state of Sonora was placed under a "yellow" alert, while a green alert was declared for the northern portions. The port of Guaymas was closed for small craft. Along the Baja California Peninsula officials activated 900 emergency workers to assist in the supply of food and fuel. Additionally, 164 shelters were opened. On September 5, the "orange" alert was upped to a "red" (maximum) alert.

When the remnants of Norbert spread into the United States, local National Weather Service offices issued flash flood watches and warnings, with watches posted across portions of California, Arizona, Nevada, Utah, and Colorado. Several schools in Arizona were closed or delayed due to flooding.

== Mexican impact ==
Roads surrounding Manzanillo were closed for three hours due to landslides. Further north, several homes in Jalisco were flooded. In Nayarit, three people were evacuated to shelters. A man died in Mazatlán, Sinaloa after being swept away by a swollen stream, and two women in Chihuahua drowned while driving across a flooded creek. In Puerto San Carlos, a mudslide forced 425 people from two hotels to seek shelter. A dam collapsed northwest of the city due to the rains, causing flooding 5 ft (1.5 m) deep in the town. The resultant floods damaged 2,500 homes and left about 2,500 people homeless, about one-third of its population. Throughout the municipalities of La Paz, Los Cabos, and Comondu, 2,000 people were evacuated to shelters, including 785 people in La Paz alone. Throughout the peninsula, 500 were rendered as homeless.

== Southwestern United States flood event ==
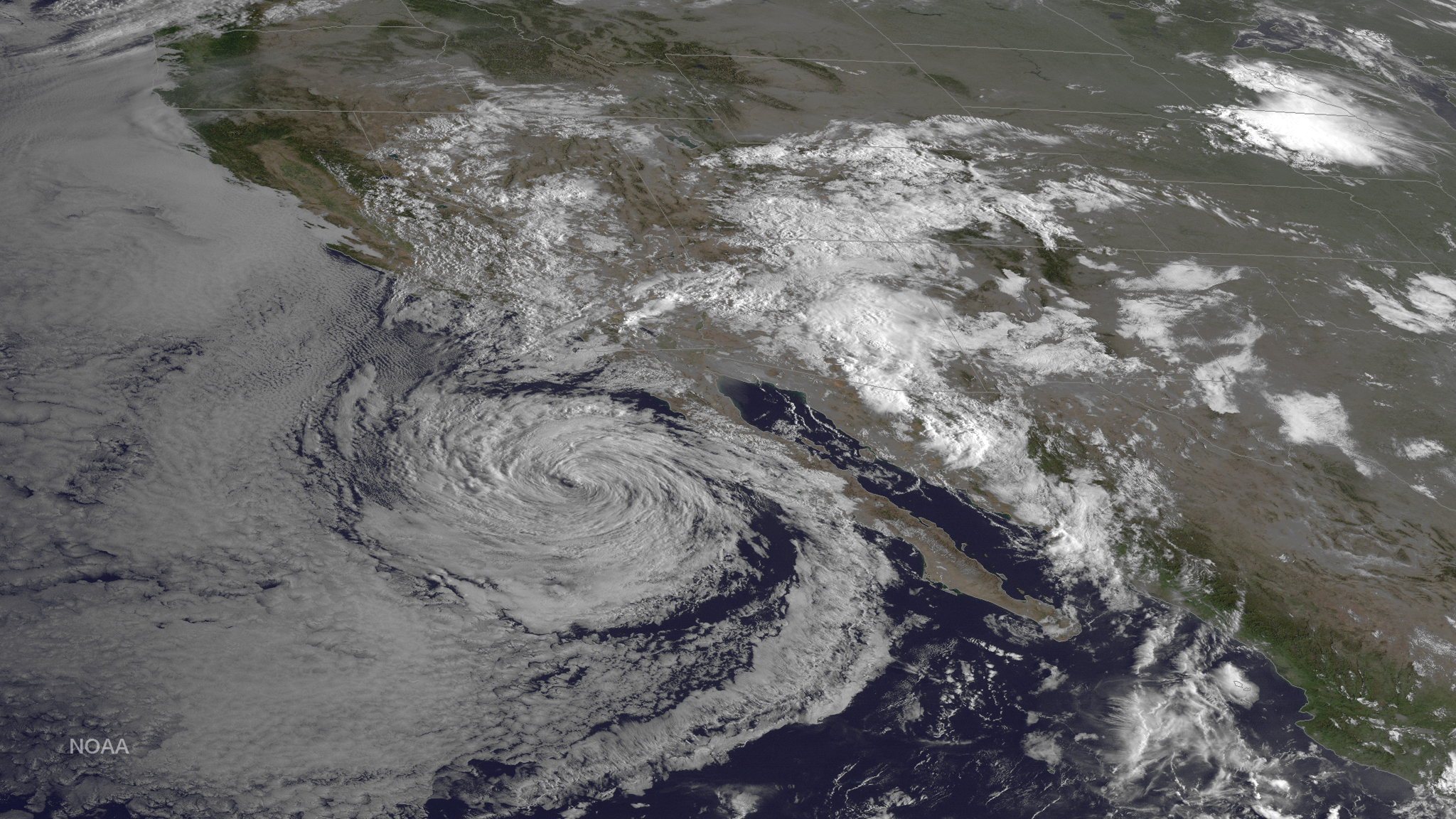
Moisture associated with the remnants of Norbert brought on flash flooding in much of the southwestern United States

The circulation of Norbert, in conjunction with the remnants of Atlantic Tropical Storm Dolly, spread moisture across northwest Mexico and into the southwestern United States. Rainfall in southern California peaked at around 3 in (76 mm) in Hemet. The rains caused flooding along several freeways and other roads, stranding 70 cars along Route 74 near Mountain Center. Near Palm Springs, over 40 travelers required rescue after their cars were flooded. One nearby school was evacuated. Around 70 motorists got stuck on California State Route 74 due to flooding. Along the northern section of Riverside, many trees were toppled and power lines were knocked down. Almost all freeways across the Inland Empire were flooded. Damage in the state amounted to $706,000 (USD).

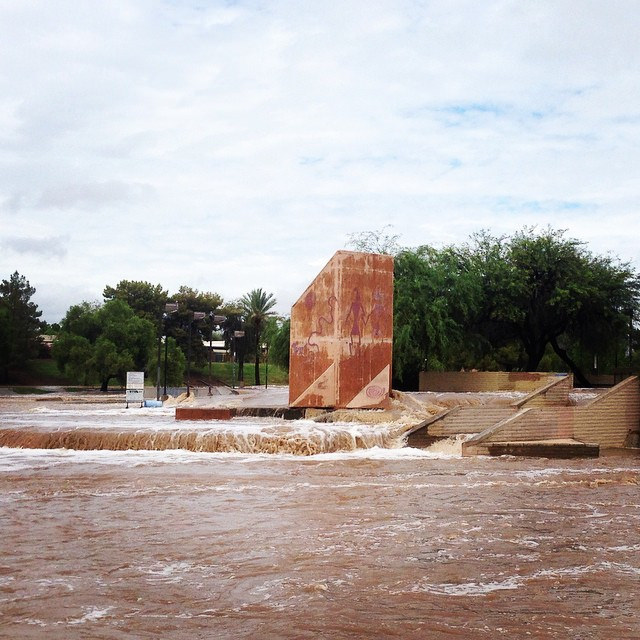
Flooding in Scottsdale, Arizona

In Arizona, rainfall peaked at 6.09 in (155 mm) near Chandler. During a seven-hour period, Phoenix Sky Harbor Airport recorded 3.30 in (84 mm) of rainfall, breaking the 75‑year‑old daily rainfall record. It was also the highest precipitation in a single calendar day, but fell short of the station's 24‑hour rainfall total. The rainfall was more than the city's average summer rainfall. About one of every three Maricopa County rain gauges set all-time records. Accumulations in Chandler and Mesa were deemed to be a 1-in-1,000 year event while Phoenix was calculated to be a 1-in-200 year event. The floods covered several roads and highways, which closed portions of Interstates 17 and 10. County-wide, 10,000 customers lost power. In Mesa, residents from 100 homes were evacuated. Two women died, one in Pinal County and one in Tucson; both were swept away by floodwaters in their vehicles. Waters in Tucson reached as deep as 15 ft (4.6 m). In several locations, pumping stations were unable to handle the deluge. About 10,000 people lost power in the state. In response to the flooding, Governor Jan Brewer issued a state of emergency and ordered nonessential workers to remain at home. Overall, the flooding was the worst to affect that state since 1970. Total damage statewide amounted to $18 million.

New Mexico Highway 152 suffered significant damage, with portions of the road washed away and debris covering large stretches of road. Due to the severity of damage, the New Mexico Department of Transportation closed the road indefinitely and stated it could be more than a month until it was re-opened.

In Nevada, rainfall totaled over 4 in (100 mm) in a short period of time, causing the worst flooding in the Moapa Valley since 1981. The flooding prompted The National Weather Service to issue a strongly worded flash flood emergency for the Moapa Valley, advising people to avoid travel and keep local roads open for emergency operations. The waters closed a 30 mi (48 km) section of Interstate 15 in both directions. Several vehicles were washed away along the interstate and damaged the road forcing the closure for several days. The cost of the repairs to the road are expected to be in excess of $5 million. Indian Reservation in Moapa was evacuated due to the floods. Up to 200 children were trapped in an elementary school due to waters 12 ft (3.7 m) deep. Damage in the state amounted to $9.64 million.

== See also ==
- Other storms of the same name
- Hurricane Doreen (1977)
- Hurricane Nora (1997)
- Hurricane Jimena (2009)
- Hurricane Paul (2012)
- Hurricane Linda (2015)
- List of Baja California Peninsula hurricanes
- List of California hurricanes
- List of Arizona hurricanes
