= Tropical Storm Claudia (1962) =

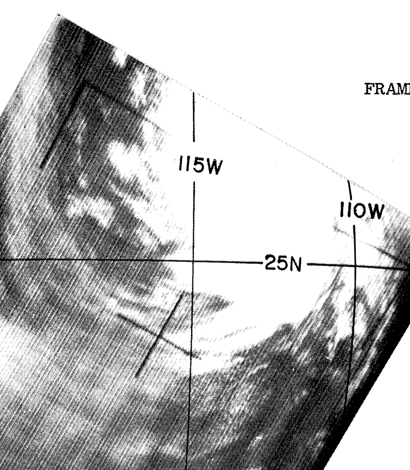
- Tropical Storm Claudia on September 22.

Meteorological history
- Formed: September 20, 1962
- Dissipated: September 24, 1962

Tropical storm
- 1-minute sustained (SSHWS/NWS)
- Highest winds: 60 mph (95 km/h)
- Lowest pressure: 990 mbar (hPa); 29.23 inHg

Overall effects
- Fatalities: 1 (indirect)
- Damage: $11 million (1962 USD)
- Areas affected: Baja California Sur, Arizona, California
- Part of the 1962 Pacific hurricane season

Tropical Storm Claudia was the 6th named tropical cyclone of the 1962 Pacific hurricane season and was the first instance of the name Claudia being used. Claudia formed to the southwest of Acapulco, Mexico on September 20. The storm had moved northeast to the Baja California Sur and had made landfall over the Baja California peninsula on September 23. The storm had dissipated, and the remnants of Claudia had caused much rain over Mexico (Baja California), California (mainly Santa Rosa), and Arizona (mainly Marana and Sells).

== Meteorological history ==
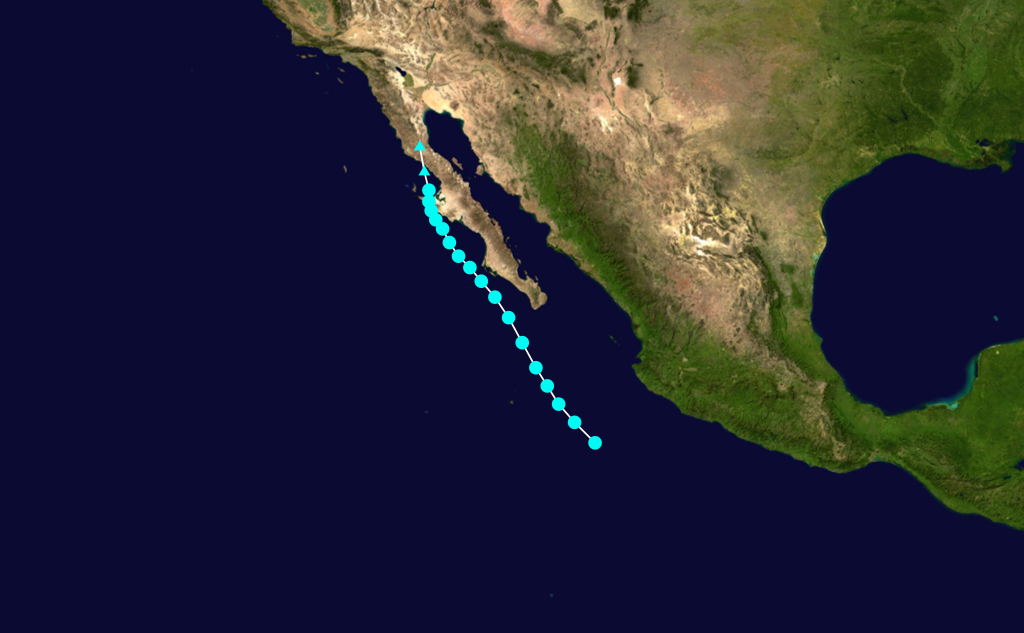
Map plotting the storm's track and intensity, according to the Saffir–Simpson scale Map key Saffir–Simpson scale Tropical depression (≤38 mph, ≤62 km/h) Tropical storm (39–73 mph, 63–118 km/h) Category 1 (74–95 mph, 119–153 km/h) Category 2 (96–110 mph, 154–177 km/h) Category 3 (111–129 mph, 178–208 km/h) Category 4 (130–156 mph, 209–251 km/h) Category 5 (≥157 mph, ≥252 km/h) Unknown Storm type Tropical cyclone Subtropical cyclone Extratropical cyclone, remnant low, tropical disturbance, or monsoon depression

A well-organized low-pressure system had formed on the 19th of September southwest of Acapulco, Mexico on September. The low-pressure system had soon been classified as 07E on the 19th and soon classified as Tropical Storm Claudia at around 8:00 AM UTC.

On September 23, the storm had reached Cedros Island, near the Baja California peninsula. Tropical Storm Claudia made landfall in the western area of the Baja California province, dropping tons of rainfall over the peninsula. The remnant had poured more than 7 inches of rainfall on the Arizona-Sonora Desert Museum, west of Tucson. Marana, Sells, and Tucson had experienced severe flash floods during the landfall.

The Santa Cruz River had experienced an overflow and soon, flooded. Flow in the river's channels reached depths of more than 20 feet with 4 to 5 feet waves. The overflow depths shifts from less than one foot to over six feet in the flooded plains. The damage in Arizona had reported to be more than US$8,000,000. The flooding in the state had pressured a disaster declaration by then governor of Arizona Paul Fannin, which provided US$30,000 for the affected people in Arizona.

== Impacts ==
Tropical Storm Claudia was the most costliest storm in the season, mounting up to US$11 million.

=== Arizona ===
8 million was done in Arizona alone, which marks it as one of the most costliest storms in Arizona, behind Tropical Storm Norma in 1993. From the 8 million, 6 million was due to crop damage. Structural damages to levees, dikes, and spreader dams accounted for another $1 million. One indirect death, the death of 60 year-old Angela Bend was caused due to the heavy rainfall and flooding. It was believed that she died from natural causes, but the ambulance was unable to reach her due to the flood.

Helicopters were summoned and had rescued 27 families from Fort Huachuca, an army base. In Sells, food and medical supplies were sent to the Papago Indian Reservation Many cattle had drowned from the effect of the flooding. The Santa Rosa Wash had conveyed 53,100 cubic feet per second (1,500 cubic metres per second) at its peak capacity. Los Robles Wash had carried up to 32,600 cu ft/s (920 m^{3}/s), while the Santa Cruz River proper peaked at 9,200 cu ft/s (260 m^{3}/s). The washes and rivers reached depths of up to 20 feet (6.1 m), and overflowed its banks in places by 1 to 6 feet (0.30 to 1.83 m).

Precipitation in the Vaiva Vo downstream had reduced to 1 inch on the 26th. The major damage from the flooding had been extended approximately 100 miles along the Santa Cruz River and tributaries and had attained an 11 maximum width. Flow in the channels had reached depths of 20 feet with 4 to 5 ft. waves. Estimates for ungauged locations include Sells Wash at (17,200 cubic ft/s) and Greene Wash near Eloy (24,100 cubic ft/s).

=== California ===
The remnants of Claudia brought downpours of rainfall was seen in Santa Rosa. When Claudia made landfall in Cedros Island, the storm had moved north to California, then onto Arizona. Not much damage was reported in the state. Road damage was very severe throughout the flooded area. Most of the heaviest rain fell during the night of the 25th and on the afternoon of the 26th.

== See also ==
- 1962 Pacific hurricane season
- 1977 Pacific hurricane season
