= Riverside, Arizona =

- Populated place
- Location within the state of Arizona Riverside (the United States)
- Coordinates: 33°06′19″N 110°57′28″W
- Country: United States
- State: Arizona
- County: Pinal
- Elevation: 1,808 ft (551 m)
- Time zone: UTC-7 (Mountain (MST))
  - Summer (DST): UTC-7 (MST)
- Area code: 520
- FIPS code: 04-60460
- GNIS feature ID: 24573

Riverside is a populated place situated in Pinal County, Arizona, United States. It has an estimated elevation of 1,808 feet (551 m) above sea level.
