= Hurricane Doreen (1977) =

Category 1 Pacific hurricane in 1977

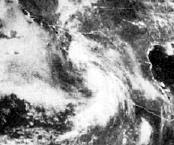
- Hurricane Doreen on August 15, 1977

Meteorological history
- Formed: August 13, 1977
- Dissipated: August 18, 1977

Category 1 hurricane
- 1-minute sustained (SSHWS/NWS)
- Highest winds: 75 mph (120 km/h)
- Lowest pressure: 979 mbar (hPa); 28.91 inHg

Overall effects
- Fatalities: 8 total
- Damage: $25 million (1977 USD)
- Areas affected: Mexico, Southwestern United States
- IBTrACS
- Part of the 1977 Pacific hurricane season

Hurricane Doreen was considered the worst tropical cyclone to affect California in 32 years. The tenth tropical cyclone, fourth named storm, and second hurricane of the otherwise inactive 1977 Pacific hurricane season, it developed on August 13. The depression tracked northwestward, intensifying into Tropical Storm Doreen later that day. Further strengthening occurred over the subsequent days, and Doreen attained its peak as a minimal hurricane early on August 15. Executing a turn towards the north-northwest, Doreen made its first landfall as a Category 1 hurricane on the Saffir–Simpson Hurricane Wind Scale near Puerto San Carlos. Drifting offshore, Doreen made a second and final landfall near the northern portion of the Baja California as a tropical storm before rapidly weakening to a tropical depression. The tropical depression dissipated south of southern California on August 18.

Hurricane Doreen and its remnants caused severe flooding in northwestern Mexico and the southwestern United States. In Mexico, heavy rainfall was reported on both Baja California and the mainland of Mexico. Flooding left 2,000 people homeless in Mexicali along the United States-Mexico border, in addition, 325 homes and businesses were destroyed in southern California. Several highways were also flooded during the passage of the storm, most notably, lanes on Interstate 8 and Interstate 15 were washed out. In San Diego and Imperial County, the total damage to agricultural interests was $25 million (1977 USD). In addition, eight fatalities were reported in California. Elsewhere, impact from Doreen was relatively light.

== Meteorological history ==
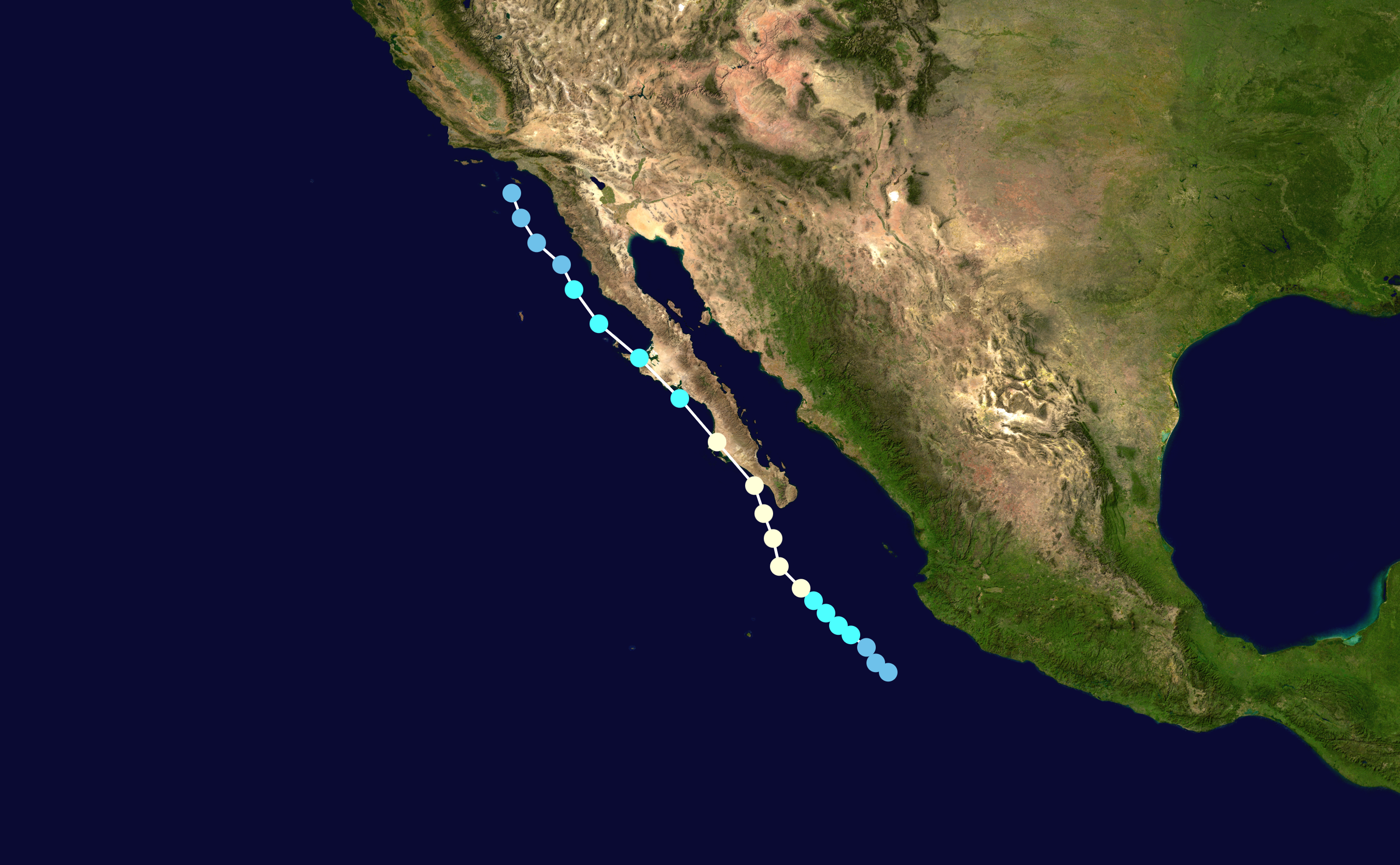
Map plotting the storm's track and intensity, according to the Saffir–Simpson scale Map key Saffir–Simpson scale Tropical depression (≤38 mph, ≤62 km/h) Tropical storm (39–73 mph, 63–118 km/h) Category 1 (74–95 mph, 119–153 km/h) Category 2 (96–110 mph, 154–177 km/h) Category 3 (111–129 mph, 178–208 km/h) Category 4 (130–156 mph, 209–251 km/h) Category 5 (≥157 mph, ≥252 km/h) Unknown Storm type Tropical cyclone Subtropical cyclone Extratropical cyclone, remnant low, tropical disturbance, or monsoon depression

The origins of Hurricane Doreen were a tropical disturbance which formed 115 mi (185 km) west of Acapulco, on August 11. Over the next two days, the system drifted westward at 7 mph (11 km/h). By 0000 UTC August 13, the Eastern Pacific Hurricane Center began classifying the system as Tropical Depression Ten, centered 460 mi (740 km) west of Acapulco, Mexico. Immediately after developing, the depression curved northwestward, and began slowly intensifying over sea surface temperatures (SST's) of 82 °F (28 °C). By 1800 UTC, winds increased to 50 mph (85 km/h), and the depression was then upgraded to Tropical Storm Doreen, which was centered about 530 mi (850 km) west-northwest of Acapulco. Air Force reconnaissance began investigating Doreen late on August 14, and located the center about 185 mi (298 km) south of the tip of Baja California. Another flight into the storm shortly thereafter confirmed that Doreen had intensified into a hurricane at 1800 UTC.

At that time, the eye of Doreen was around 17 mi (27 km) in diameter. After becoming a hurricane, Doreen re-curved to the north-northwest as it sped up slightly to 10 mph (16 km/h). Doreen approached the Baja California Peninsula, as it maintained minimal hurricane status. By August 18 at 1800 UTC, Doreen was centered only 17 mi (27 km) when it curved northwestward. Late on August 18, the storm made landfall on the western coast of Baja California as a minimal hurricane. Unlike Hurricane Kathleen in 1976 which accelerated inland, Doreen moved slowly and re-emerged into the Pacific Ocean, over SST's of less than 72 °F (22 °C). As a result, Doreen weakened to a tropical storm before making another landfall on the Port Eugenia Peninsula on August 16 shortly after 0600 UTC. Once again, Doreen quickly re-emerged into the Pacific Ocean over the Bay of Sebastián Vizcaíno. Due to SST's as low as 68 °F (20 °C), Doreen continued to weaken, and was downgraded to a tropical depression early on August 17. After satellite imagery noted a poorly-defined low-level circulation, the final advisory was issued on Doreen, which was centered about 29 miles (47 km) west of San Clemente Island, California at 0000 UTC on August 18. The remnants of the storm tracked into the Southwestern United States and dissipated over the Colorado River Valley.

== Impact ==
=== Mexico ===
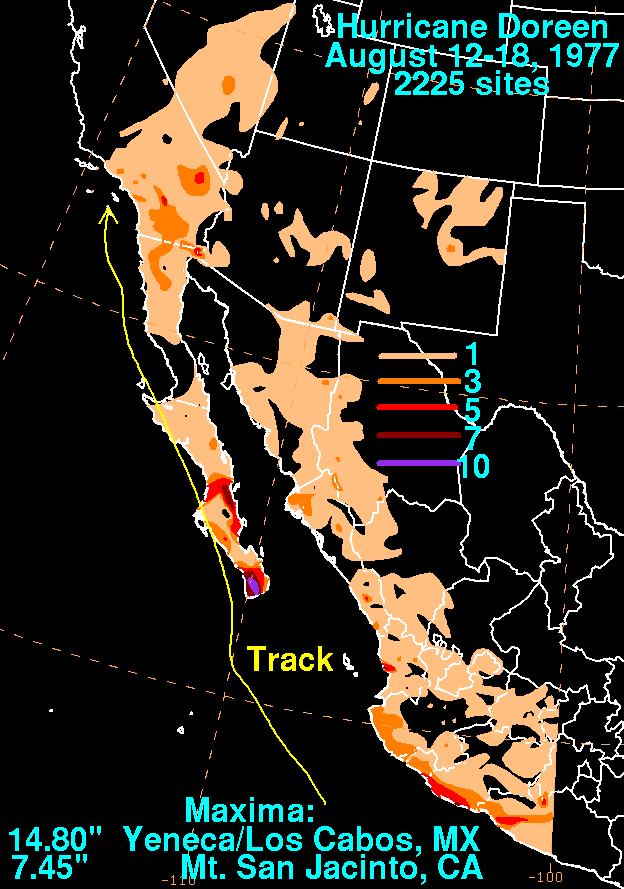
Rainfall summary for Hurricane Doreen

Hurricane Doreen dropped heavy rainfall along the western portions of Mexico and the Southwestern Region of the United States. In Mexico, Doreen produced heaviest precipitation along the Baja California peninsula, where rainfall peaked at 14.80 in (376 mm) in the Los Cabos Area. The mainland of Mexico also received heavy rainfall, especially in the Sierra Madre Oriental mountains. In the city of Mexicali, the storm left more than 2,000 people homeless, many of which lived in shanty-style homes.

=== California ===
In anticipation of the storm, flash flood warnings were issued in the Colorado River Valley area, and were extended into southern California on August 16, including places such as Santa Barbara County, the mountains of San Diego County, Riverside County, and portions of the Mohave Desert. Heavy rainfall fell in southern California on August 16. An average of 2–4 in (51–102 mm) of rain fell over low-lying areas of southern California for a period of three days. Heavier precipitation was reported in the mountainous areas, where rainfall peaked at 7.45 in (189 mm) on San Jacinto Peak. Several other locations also reported heavy rainfall; 3.78 in (96 mm) was reported in Calexico and 6 in (150 mm) fell at Mitchell Caverns. At Edwards Air Force Base, the launch of Space Shuttle Enterprise on August 31 was delayed to September 7 after rainfall from Doreen flooded the runway of the previous flight.

In addition to heavy rain, high winds were reported. In Palm Springs, wind gusts were reported as high as 60 mph (95 km/h). As a result, several trees were felled and power outages occurred. Highway 86 and 111 were under water from Brawley, near the Mexican border to the Salton Sea. California State Route 98 was also flooded from Brawley to Blythe. Two of the four lanes on Interstate 15 were washed out from Los Angeles to Las Vegas, stranding thousands of gamblers in places like Barstow. Ocotillo, a town that was devastated during Hurricane Kathleen in 1976, was flooded again. Buses were sent to evacuate the townspeople, but the residents declined to evacuate. Overall, damage totaled $25 million, mostly in agricultural losses in San Diego and Imperial Counties. Eight deaths were reported. Six children were swept away in the Los Angeles River; five of them were rescued, but the sixth was later presumed dead.

=== Arizona ===
Doreen also produced heavy rainfall in a small area of southwestern Arizona, limited to the Yuma area. Along the border of Arizona, California, and Mexico, rainfall was recorded between 2 and 7 in (51 and 178 mm). Rainfall in the state of Arizona had peaked at 7.01 in (178 mm) in that area. Light to moderate rainfall also occurred in other areas of the state, such as Nogales, where 3.10 in (79 mm) of precipitation was recorded. Damage to roads, levees, houses, dikes were reported throughout the state, especially in the Bullhead City area.

While surveying damage in southwestern Arizona, a request was made to then-Governor Raul Hector Castro for $750,000 in emergency services funds. The American Red Cross had been in the area and spent $12,000 to assist families that were left homeless after the flood.

=== Elsewhere in the United States ===
Further west, larger swaths of rainfall occurred in Nevada, though precipitation was generally light with many areas experiencing less than 3 in (76 mm). Rainfall in Nevada had peaked at 4.14 in (105 mm) in Avaden, making Doreen the wettest tropical cyclone for the state of Nevada until Hurricane Hilary. In Las Vegas, major intersections were flooded due to 1.5 in (38 mm) of rain. In addition to street flooding, some roofs of houses and buildings collapsed.

In New Mexico, lesser amounts of rainfall were reported, and precipitation was limited to the northeastern and southwestern portions of the state. Much it the rainfall was between 1 and 2 in (25 and 51 mm), and precipitation with the state peaked at 2.05 in (52 mm) in the city of Florida. Rainfall was also minimal in the state of Utah, with only a few isolated areas reporting light precipitation, and generally did not exceed 3 in (76 mm). However, rainfall peaked at 4.31 in (109 mm) in Logan.

== See also ==
- Hurricane Kathleen (1976)
- Hurricane Dolores (2015)
- Hurricane Hilary (2023)
- List of Pacific hurricanes
- List of Baja California Peninsula hurricanes
- List of California hurricanes
