= Tropical Storm Norma (1970) =

Pacific tropical storm in 1970

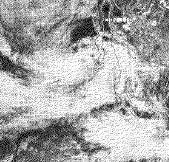
- Tropical Storm Norma near peak intensity

Meteorological history
- Formed: August 31, 1970
- Dissipated: September 5, 1970

Tropical storm
- 1-minute sustained (SSHWS/NWS)
- Highest winds: 60 mph (95 km/h)
- Lowest pressure: 992 mbar (hPa); 29.29 inHg

Overall effects
- Fatalities: 23 indirect
- Damage: $1 million (1997 USD)
- Areas affected: Arizona, Utah, Colorado, New Mexico, Baja California
- IBTrACS
- Part of the 1970 Pacific hurricane season

Tropical Storm Norma was the fourteenth named tropical cyclone of the 1970 Pacific hurricane season. The storm formed off the coast of Mexico and intensified rapidly, peaking as a strong tropical storm on September 3, before starting a weakening trend. It dissipated before making landfall on Baja California.

While the storm never made landfall, the remnants from the storm fueled the Labor Day Storm of 1970, causing floods in Arizona that resulted in heavy damage and loss of life. The rainfall from this storm broke records, mostly for 24-hour rainfall totals. Despite not being tropical when the damages were done, Norma is considered to be the deadliest disaster in Arizona history.

== Meteorological history ==
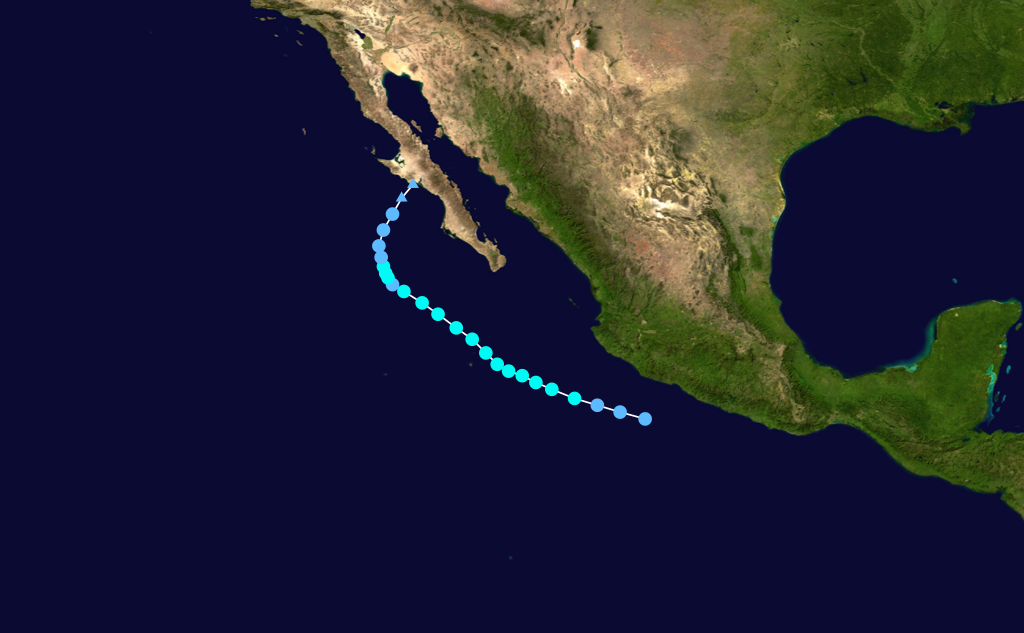
Map plotting the storm's track and intensity, according to the Saffir–Simpson scale Map key Saffir–Simpson scale Tropical depression (≤38 mph, ≤62 km/h) Tropical storm (39–73 mph, 63–118 km/h) Category 1 (74–95 mph, 119–153 km/h) Category 2 (96–110 mph, 154–177 km/h) Category 3 (111–129 mph, 178–208 km/h) Category 4 (130–156 mph, 209–251 km/h) Category 5 (≥157 mph, ≥252 km/h) Unknown Storm type Tropical cyclone Subtropical cyclone Extratropical cyclone, remnant low, tropical disturbance, or monsoon depression

A tropical disturbance was first noted in a satellite picture taken on August 30. Soon after, a weak low pressure center associated with the system formed 100 nautical miles (190 km) southwest of Acapulco, Mexico. The system later went through rapid intensification, becoming a tropical depression on August 31 and Tropical Storm Norma later that day. Initially, with a loose organization, Norma continued to organize and strengthen, reaching its peak of 60 mph (100 km/h) on September 2. Satellite pictures showed cirrus outflow was greater in the tops of the feeder bands than in the eyewall chimney. On September 3, Navy reconnaissance reported a 992 mbar pressure, Norma's lowest.

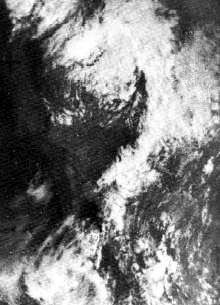
The Labor Day Storm of 1970 on September 5th. The storm was drawing moisture from the weakening Norma, which is visible to the south southwest of the storm.

Shortly after the 992 mbar report, however, Norma began to weaken. The same recon that reported the 60 mph (100 km/h) and 992 mbar reading reported back with a mere 40 mph (60 km/h) some time after. Despite the sudden drop in winds, the minimum pressure remained around 994 mbar. The weakening became obvious on satellite presentation, which showed cool inflow and a sheet of stratocumulus clouds around the west semicircle extending under the storm clouds. Norma continued to weaken, degrading into a depression by September 4. At this point, the circulation forced moist and unstable maritime air into Arizona which resulted in disastrous floods during Labor Day along with a slow moving cold front. This system would become known as the Labor Day Storm of 1970. On September 5, a cloud spiral was still visible west of Baja California, but the storm's circulation dissipated, with the remnants of the storm finally dissipating on September 6, just before making landfall on Baja California.

== Impact ==
While Norma did not make landfall while tropical (even though it came close to making landfall on Baja California before dissipating), the circulation introduced unstable air into Arizona and Utah which, along with a cold front, resulted in record amounts of rainfall.

=== Baja California ===
For an 800 mi (1,300 km) stretch of the coat, 12 ft (3.7 m) waves were measured. Winds of 60 mph (97 km/h) were recorded at Bahia Tortugas, a village on Punta Eugenia.

=== Arizona ===
The rainfall in Arizona produced deadly flash floods which caused over $1 million in damages and killed 23 people, 14 of whom died when Tonto Creek, which was in the vicinity of Kohl's Ranch, became flooded. Other deaths were reported among automobile drivers. Total rainfall exceeded 7 inches in certain locations, with Workman's Creek receiving 11.92 inches (303 mm) of rain. Other amounts were recorded in Upper Parker Creek (9.09 inches), Mount Lemmon (8.74 inches), Sunflower (8.44 inches), Kitt Peak (8.08 inches), Tonto Creek Fish Hatchery (7.12 inches), and Crown King (7.02 inches). There were also reports of injuries by campers in Mogollon Rim and Scottsdale reported significant property damage. As many as 23 lives were lost due to the unprecedented nature of the floods, with 14 deaths reported from flash flooding near Tonto Creek. The major flooding in the state prompted a presidential disaster declaration.

=== Utah ===
While the storm was causing floods in Arizona, the lower cities of Utah were also experiencing heavy rainfall. The most noteworthy rainfall total was recorded in Bug Creek, which experienced an estimated 6 inches (150 mm) of rain in a 24-hour period. No deaths or damage was reported in connection to the storm.

=== Records ===
When 11.40 inches (290 mm) of rain fell at Workman's Creek in a 24-hour period, it became the highest amount of rain to fall in Arizona in a 24-hour period. The record stood until 1997, when the remnants of Hurricane Nora produced 11.97 inches (304 mm) of rain on the top of Harquahala Mountain.

A similar record was recorded in Utah when 6 inches (150 mm) of rain fell in Bug Creek in a 24-hour period. Unlike the Arizona rainfall record, this record still stands today.

When the rains of Norma caused the San Juan River to flood its banks, a size of 1,090 m^{3} was obtained, making this the largest flood of the San Juan since 1962, when the Navajo Dam was completed. The most runoff from the storm was downstream from the reservoir.

With 23 associated deaths in Arizona, Norma was the deadliest storm in the state's history.

== See also ==
- List of wettest tropical cyclones in Arizona
- Hurricane Nora (1997) - 1997 hurricane in the East Pacific that produced gale-force winds and heavy rainfall in the Southwestern United States.
- Other storms with the same name
