= List of Nevada hurricanes =

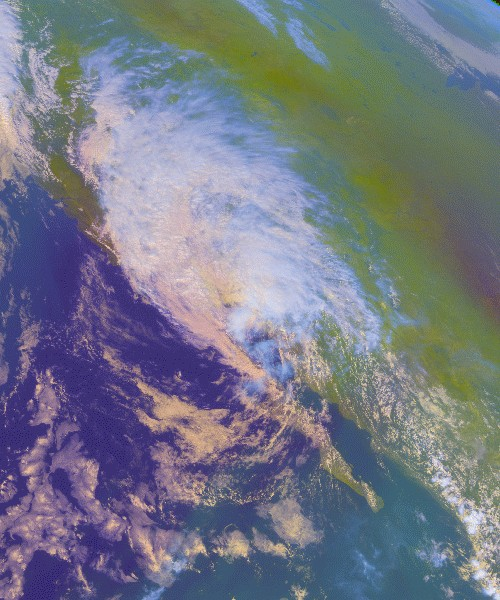
Satellite image of Hurricane Nora dissipating over the southwestern United States in September 1997

The inland U.S. state of Nevada has experienced impacts from at least 11 tropical cyclones or their remnants. The biggest threat from such storms in the state is their associated rainfall and flooding. The wettest storm was from Hurricane Hilary in 2023, which produced 9.20 in (234 mm) of precipitation in Lee Canyon. Hilary caused around $25 million in damage. The remnants of Hurricane Nora in 1997 contributed to two deaths due to weather-related accidents.

== List of storms ==
- 1972 — Hurricane Joanne brought 0.55 in (14 mm) of rain to Beowawe.
- September 11, 1976 — Hurricane Kathleen brings heavy rain in the Reno area.
- August 18, 1977 — Hurricane Doreen brought up to 4.14 in (105 mm) in the state of Nevada, the wettest tropical cyclone in the state at that time.
- September 6, 1978 — Hurricane Norman brings snow in the Sierra Nevada, resulting in the deaths of four hikers.
- 1982 — Hurricane Olivia
- June 4–11, 1990 — Hurricane Boris produced a plume of moisture that spread across the western United States, with rainfall reaching 2.00 in (51 mm) in Lund.
- August 24, 1992 — Tropical Storm Lester entered Arizona as a tropical storm, and its outer periphery dropped 0.22 in (5.6 mm) of rainfall near Montello.
- September 26, 1997 — Hurricane Nora struck western Mexico, entered the United States near the California/Arizona border, and later became the only tropical storm on record to pass near southern Nevada. Nora produced winds of 45–50 mph (75–85 km/h) across Nevada's Spring Mountains. Rainfall reached 3.53 in (90 mm) on Mount Charleston at Kyle Canyon. Nora contributed to two deaths in the state – one due to a plane crash during the storm, and the other due to a car crash.
- September 5, 1998 — Hurricane Isis brings rainfall totals in excess of 0.75 in (19 mm) to the state of Nevada.
- September 7–8, 2014 — Hurricane Norbert triggered a flash flood emergency for portions of Nevada while crossing through the state, and flooding in the state resulted in $9.64 million in damage.
- October 3, 2018 — Moisture from the remnants of Hurricane Rosa produced flash flooding in Pioche, as well as thunderstorms that produced winds of 60 mph (97 km/h).
- September 8–14, 2022 — Hurricane Kay brought flooding into the state of Nevada, resulting in $167,000 in damage.
- August 20, 2023 — Hurricane Hilary struck the Baja California Peninsula and moved across the western United States. It dropped heavy rainfall in Nevada, reaching 9.20 in (234 mm) at Lee Canyon, which was the heaviest rainfall from a tropical cyclone in the state. The rains produced flash flooding that caused $25 million worth of damage, with roads, pipes, and trails washed away. In a mountainous area near Mount Charleston in Clark County, Nevada, wind gusts reached 82 mph (132 km/h), strong enough to knock down a few trees.
- August 23, 2023 — Moisture partially fueled by Atlantic Tropical Storm Harold leads to intense flooding in Las Vegas, resulting in a fatality.
- September 17–18, 2025 — Remnants of Tropical Storm Mario bring about 0.24 inches (6.1 mm) of rain to Harry Reid International Airport, the most at the airport since May 6 that year. Storms from Mario also moved through Northern Nevada, bringing thunderstorms and slight rain.
- October 11, 2026 - The remnants of Tropical Storm Rachel brought record-breaking rainfall, flash flood threats, and powerful winds to Las Vegas.

== Climatological statistics ==
Number of recorded storms affecting Nevada
Month	Number of storms
June	1
August	4
September	6
October	1

Number of recorded storms affecting Nevada
Period	Number of storms
1970s	4
1980s	1
1990s	4
2010s	2
2020s	4

== See also ==
- List of United States hurricanes
