= Hurricane Joanne (1972) =

Category 2 Pacific hurricane in 1972

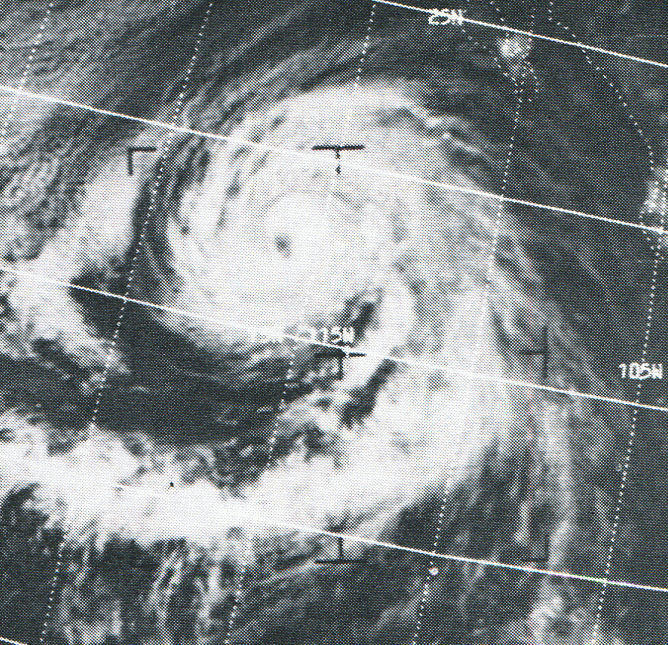
- Hurricane Joanne on October 2

Meteorological history
- Formed: September 30, 1972
- Dissipated: October 7, 1972

Category 2 hurricane
- 1-minute sustained (SSHWS/NWS)
- Highest winds: 100 mph (155 km/h)
- Lowest pressure: 971 mbar (hPa); 28.67 inHg

Overall effects
- Fatalities: 1 direct, 9 indirect
- Damage: $10 million (1972 USD)
- Areas affected: Baja California, California, Arizona, New Mexico
- IBTrACS
- Part of the 1972 Pacific hurricane season

Hurricane Joanne was one of four tropical cyclones to bring gale-force winds to the Southwestern United States in the 20th century. A tropical depression developed on September 30, 1972. It then moved west northwest and intensified into a hurricane on October 1. Hurricane Joanne peaked as a Category 2 hurricane, as measured by the modern Saffir-Simpson hurricane wind scale (SSHWS), October 2. Joanne then slowed and began to re-curve. Joanne made landfall along the northern portion of the Baja California Peninsula as a tropical storm. The tropical storm moved inland over Sonora on October 6 and was believed to have survived into Arizona as a tropical storm. In Arizona, many roads were closed and some water rescues had to be performed due to a prolonged period of heavy rains. One person was reportedly killed while another was electrocuted. A few weeks after the hurricane, Arizona would sustain additional flooding and eight additional deaths.

== Meteorological history ==
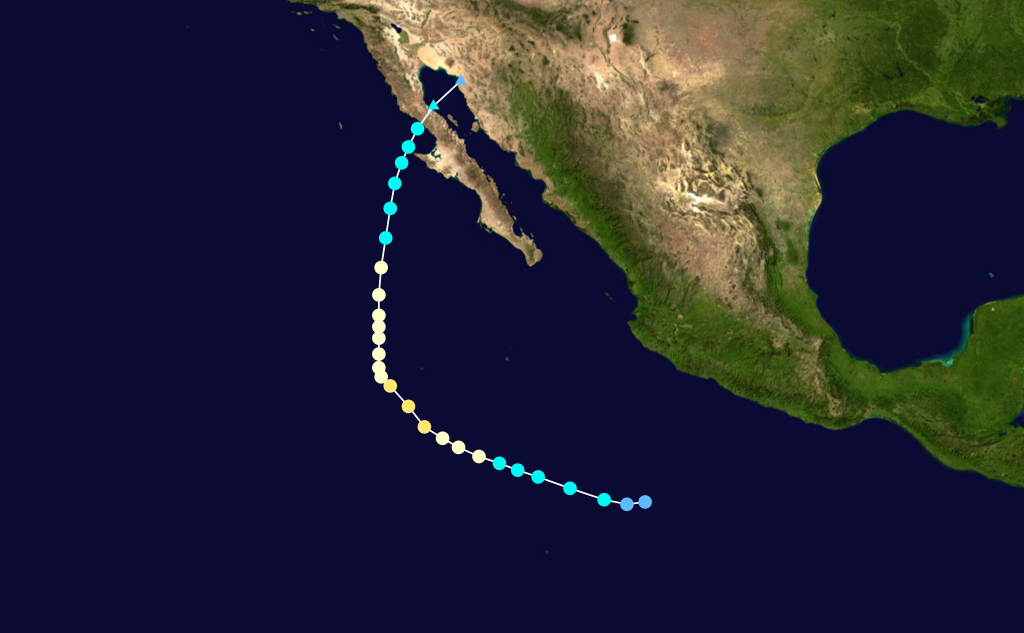
Map plotting the storm's track and intensity, according to the Saffir–Simpson scale Map key Saffir–Simpson scale Tropical depression (≤38 mph, ≤62 km/h) Tropical storm (39–73 mph, 63–118 km/h) Category 1 (74–95 mph, 119–153 km/h) Category 2 (96–110 mph, 154–177 km/h) Category 3 (111–129 mph, 178–208 km/h) Category 4 (130–156 mph, 209–251 km/h) Category 5 (≥157 mph, ≥252 km/h) Unknown Storm type Tropical cyclone Subtropical cyclone Extratropical cyclone, remnant low, tropical disturbance, or monsoon depression

On September 26, ship reports and satellite imagery indicated an area of squally weather about 300 mi (485 km) south of Guatemala. During September 27 and September 28, the disturbance moved westward. On September 29, the disturbance developed a closed low-level atmospheric circulation. The following day, the system was designated as a tropical storm after a ship reported winds of 45 mph (70 km/h). A Hurricane Hunter aircraft investigated the growing storm on October 1 and estimated maximum sustained winds of 75 mph (120 km/h), making Joanne a Category 1 hurricane. However, very few ships reported winds greater than 30 mph (50 km/h) at that time. On October 2, the EPHC classified Joanne as a Category 2 system on the Saffir-Simpson Scale. Furthermore, Joanne was estimated to have attained its peak intensity of 100 mph (160 km/h).

On October 4, Joanne began to recurve, and developed winds of 90 mph (145 km/h). Later that day, the Eastern Pacific Hurricane Center (EPHC) downgraded Joanne into a tropical storm as the system weakened. Accelerating north and later northeast, Joanne made landfall near Laguna Chapala on Baja California while a tropical storm late on October 5 and moved inland over Sonora on the next day. At the time of its second landfall, the EPHC suddenly stopped tracking the storm altogether, although the Weather Prediction Center believes that Joanne moved northeast into western Pima County while still a minimal tropical storm. Thereafter, Joanne was estimated to have weakened to a depression near Ajo and dissipated near Flagstaff.

== Impact ==
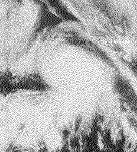
Hurricane Joanne approaching land

The initial disturbance to Joanne brought squally weather to Guatemala. Upon making landfall in Mexico, the highest rainfall total was 9.45 in (240 mm) in San Felipe/Mexicali. Puerto Penasco recorded winds of 50 mph (80 km/h). Further north, Joanne caused heavy surf in California, and brought tropical storm-force winds to the state.

Prior to landfall, flash flood watches were issued for the southern portion of the state. Heavy rainfall was reported throughout Arizona. Over 5 inches (100 mm) was measured at the Mogollon Rim. Many areas of the state received between 1 and 3 inches (25 and 76 mm) of rainfall, with isolated locations receiving over 5 inches (130 mm). In Phoenix, .78 in (20 mm) of rain fell in a four-hour period, compared to the October average of .46 in (12 mm). The Nogales Highway Bridge over the Santa Cruz River was washed away by the flooding. Some secondary roads near Tucson were flooded. Numerous water rescues were conducted in central Tucson since several major streets turned into rivers. Severe flooding was recorded in Clifton, Duncan, and Safford. An official in Maricopa County lost track on the exact number of roads that were closed because of the hurricane. Many neighborhoods in northern Phoenix were evacuated early on October 7 when a canal overflowed its banks due to prolonged rainfall. Downtown, a young man was electrocuted when he tried to remove a downed power line that was on his car. Another person was also killed in the city. Following the storm, heavy rain from Joanne set the stage for additional flooding in mid-to late October from a Gulf of Alaska extratropical cyclone that brought more moisture to the area, causing $10 million (1972 USD) in property damage and eight deaths. Further west in New Mexico, the hurricane produced 2.48 in (63 mm) of precipitation.

Hurricane Joanne was one of only four known Pacific hurricanes to bring gale-force winds to the Continental United States in the 20th century, and was the first since the 1939 California tropical storm. According to the National Weather Service, it was the first time in recorded history that a tropical cyclone had brought gale-force winds to Arizona.

== See also ==
- 1939 California tropical storm
- Hurricane Kathleen (1976)
- Hurricane Nora (1997)
- Hurricane Rosa (2018)
- Hurricane Kay (2022)
- Hurricane Hilary (2023)
