= Hurricane Nora (1997) =

Category 4 Pacific hurricane

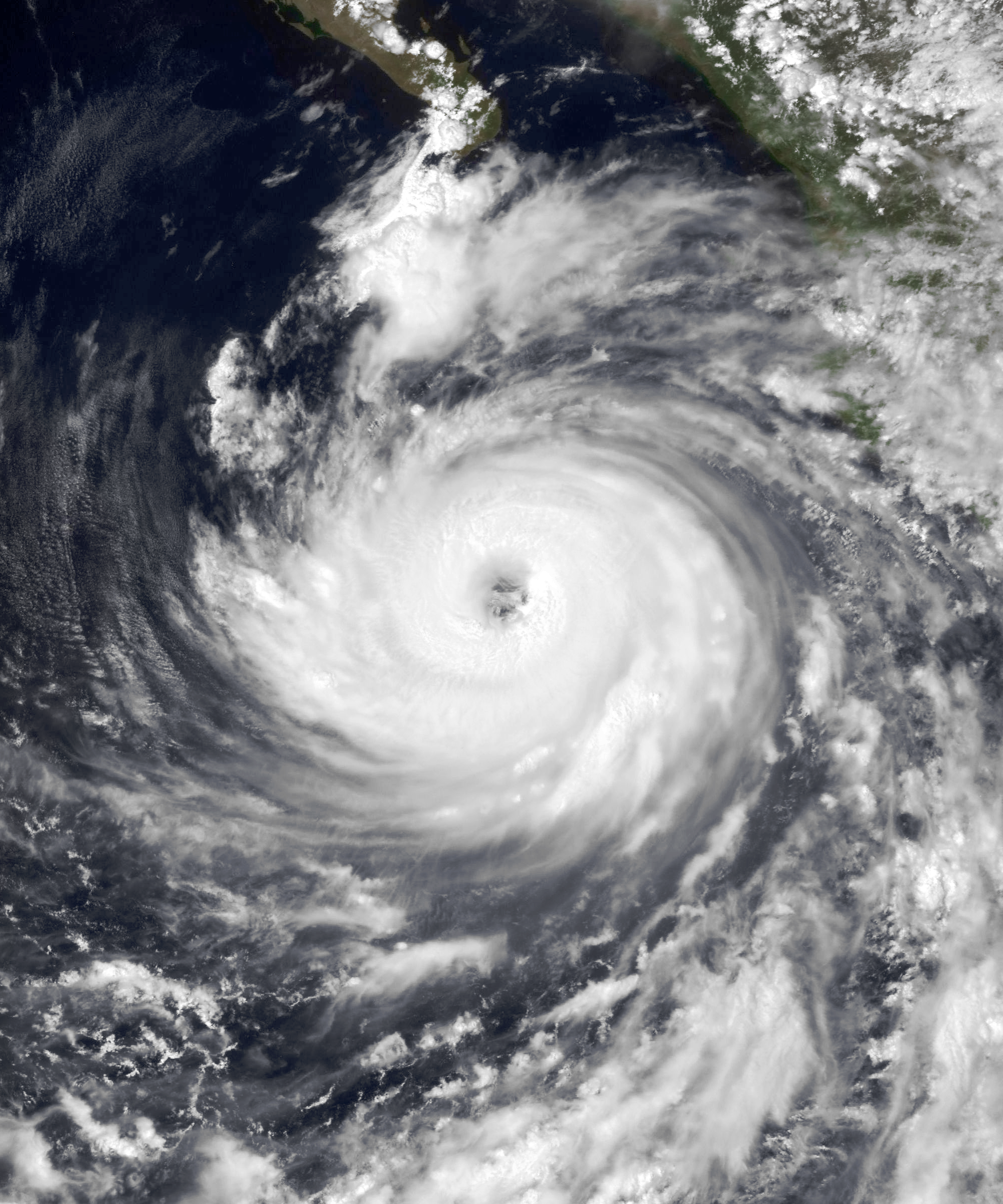
- Nora shortly after peak intensity on 21 September

Meteorological history
- Formed: 16 September 1997
- Dissipated: 26 September 1997

Category 4 major hurricane
- 1-minute sustained (SSHWS/NWS)
- Highest winds: 130 mph (215 km/h)
- Lowest pressure: 950 mbar (hPa); 28.05 inHg

Overall effects
- Fatalities: 6
- Damage: $155 million (1997 USD)
- Areas affected: Baja California, Western United States
- IBTrACS
- Part of the 1997 Pacific hurricane season

Hurricane Nora was the first tropical cyclone to enter the Continental United States from the Pacific Ocean since Hurricane Lester in 1992. Nora was the fifteenth named tropical cyclone and the seventh hurricane of the 1997 Pacific hurricane season. The September storm formed off the Pacific coast of Mexico, and aided by waters warmed by the 1997–98 El Niño event, eventually peaked at Category 4 intensity on the Saffir–Simpson hurricane scale.

Nora took an unusual path, making landfall twice as a hurricane in the Baja California Peninsula. Weakening quickly after landfall, it lashed the Southwestern United States with tropical storm-force winds, torrential rain, and flooding before becoming a remnant low. The storm was blamed for two direct casualties in Mexico, as well as substantial beach erosion on the Mexican coast, flash flooding in Baja California, and record precipitation in Arizona. It persisted far inland and eventually dissipated near the Arizona–Nevada border.

The system that was to become Hurricane Nora was likely related to a tropical wave, that had moved off the coast of Africa at the end of August 1997 and entered the Pacific Ocean during 12 September. After entering the Pacific Ocean, the wave encountered a favorable environment for tropical cyclogenesis, which caused the system to become better organized and develop into Tropical Storm Nora on 16 September. Over the next couple of days, the system continued to become better organized as it slowly moved north-westwards over the Pacific Ocean away from southwestern Mexico and intensified into a Category 2 hurricane on the Saffir-Simpson hurricane wind scale during 18 September. The steering currents subsequently became weak or balanced over the hurricane which caused the system to become near-stationary and weaken into a Category 1 hurricane.

Nora impacted the majority of Mexico's Pacific-facing coasts including the states of Baja California, Colima, Guerrero, Jalisco, Michoacán, Nayarit, Oaxaca, Sinaloa and Sonora.

== Meteorological history ==
Map plotting the storm's track and intensity, according to the Saffir–Simpson scale Map key Saffir–Simpson scale Tropical depression (≤38 mph, ≤62 km/h) Tropical storm (39–73 mph, 63–118 km/h) Category 1 (74–95 mph, 119–153 km/h) Category 2 (96–110 mph, 154–177 km/h) Category 3 (111–129 mph, 178–208 km/h) Category 4 (130–156 mph, 209–251 km/h) Category 5 (≥157 mph, ≥252 km/h) Unknown Storm type Tropical cyclone Subtropical cyclone Extratropical cyclone, remnant low, tropical disturbance, or monsoon depression

The system that was to become Hurricane Nora was likely related to a tropical wave, that moved off the coast of Africa at the end of August 1997. The wave subsequently moved across the Atlantic Ocean and spawned Hurricane Erika in early September, before it continued to move westwards through the Caribbean Sea and entered the Pacific Ocean during 12 September. After entering the Pacific Ocean, the wave encountered a favorable environment for tropical cyclogenesis, with very warm waters of around 29–30 °C (84–86 °F) and relatively light vertical wind shear. As a result, the system became better organized and developed a closed circulation, before the United States National Hurricane Center (NHC) initiated advisories and designated the disturbance as Tropical Depression Sixteen-E during 16 September. At this time the system was located about 310 miles (500 km) to the south of Acapulco, Mexico and had started to be steered towards the west-northwest, as a result of a ridge of high pressure over northern Mexico. During that day, bands of atmospheric convection surrounding the depression increased, before the NHC reported that the system had intensified into a tropical storm and named it Nora. At this time, the NHC noted that they had limited guidance on Nora as a result of various computer problems and that there was considerable uncertainty in the forecast track.

After being named, the system became better organized with atmospheric convection becoming more concentrated near the center, as it slowly moved north-westwards over the Pacific Ocean away from south-western Mexico. During 18 September, after a Dvorak classification that correlated to 1-minute sustained winds of 75 mph (120 km/h) was received from the Tropical Forecast and Analysis Branch, the NHC reported that Nora had become a Category 1 hurricane on the Saffir–Simpson hurricane wind scale. During that day, a large and ragged banding type eye appeared on satellite imagery, which shrank as the system intensified into a Category 2 hurricane with 1-minute sustained wind speeds of 105 miles per hour (165 km/h). At around this time, steering currents over the system became weak or balanced which caused the hurricane to become near-stationary, while it was located about 320 mi (515 km) to the southwest of Acapulco. Over the next couple of days, Nora started to weaken over waters that had been upwelled by its circulation, with atmospheric convection becoming almost non-existent over Nora's eye and north-western semicircle, before it weakened into a Category 1 hurricane.

During 20 September, Nora started to drift north-northwestwards along a ridge of high pressure, into an area of very warm sea-surface temperatures parallel to Mexico's western coast. Over the next day, atmospheric convection surrounding the eye increased and quickly cooled, as the hurricane quickly intensified and ultimately peaked as a Category 4 hurricane with 1-minute sustained windspeeds of 130 mph (215 km/h). At this time the system was located about 245 mi (395 km) to the southeast of Socorro in the Revillagigedo Islands and was starting to move over waters that Hurricane Linda had cooled a few weeks earlier, while it was a Category 5 hurricane. As a result, Nora weakened into a Category 3 hurricane, before it passed within 60 km (35 mi) of Socorro in the Revillagigedo Islands during 22 September. Over the next day, the hurricane continued to move over Linda's wake and gradually weaken with the eye becoming ragged, cloud tops warming and its eyewall becoming broken. As a result, the system was classified as a Category 1 hurricane at around 04:00 Pacific Standard Time (12:00 UTC) on 23 September, while it was located about 285 km (175 mi) to the southwest of Cabo San Lucas on the Baja California peninsula.

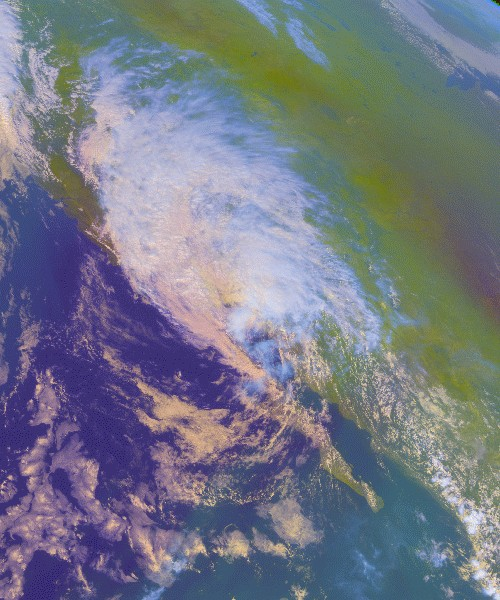
Hurricane Nora on 25 September over the northern Gulf of California

After the system had weakened into a category 1 hurricane, a fresh burst of atmospheric convection wrapped around Nora's eye, as the flow from a trough of low pressure that was associated with the remnants of Typhoon David caused the system to turn and accelerate northwards. Warm waters off the west coast of Baja California allowed the system to reintensify slightly and weaken slower than most tropical cyclones in the region, before it made landfall near Punta Eugenia in Baja California Sur at about 22:30 PST on 24 September (06:30 UTC, 25 September). The system subsequently moved over water in the vincinty of the Sebastián Vizcaíno Bay, before it made landfall at about 03:00 PST (11:00 UTC) to the south-southeast of San Fernando in Baja California as a Category 1 hurricane. As Nora moved northwards over the peninsula, atmospheric convection became less organized and the eye disappeared from infrared imagery, which caused the NHC to presume that it had weakened into a tropical storm. Later that day, Nora emerged into the northern Gulf of California and skirted the western coast as it moved northwards, before it made its final landfall near the mouth of the Colorado River to the west of Puerto Penasco, Sonora.

After the system had made its final landfall, Nora continued to move northwards and at around 13:00 PST (21:00 UTC) on 25 September, it entered the United States of America near the border of Arizona and California. This made it the first tropical cyclone to enter the Continental United States from the Pacific Ocean, since Hurricane Lester in 1992. After moving into the Continental United States, the system rapidly weakened and broke up over the mountainous terrain of the southwestern United States, before it degenerated into a tropical depression while it was located in between Blythe and Needles. The system subsequently started to move towards the north-northeast and started to look like a mid-latitude system on radar, before it was last noted at 22:00 PST (06:00 UTC, 26 September), while it was located 55 mi (90 km) to the east of Las Vegas, Nevada. Nora's upper-level circulation did not have enough time to wind down and persisted for another couple of days before it dissipated on 28 September, after it had moved through portions of Utah, Colorado, Idaho and Wyoming.

== Preparations and impact ==
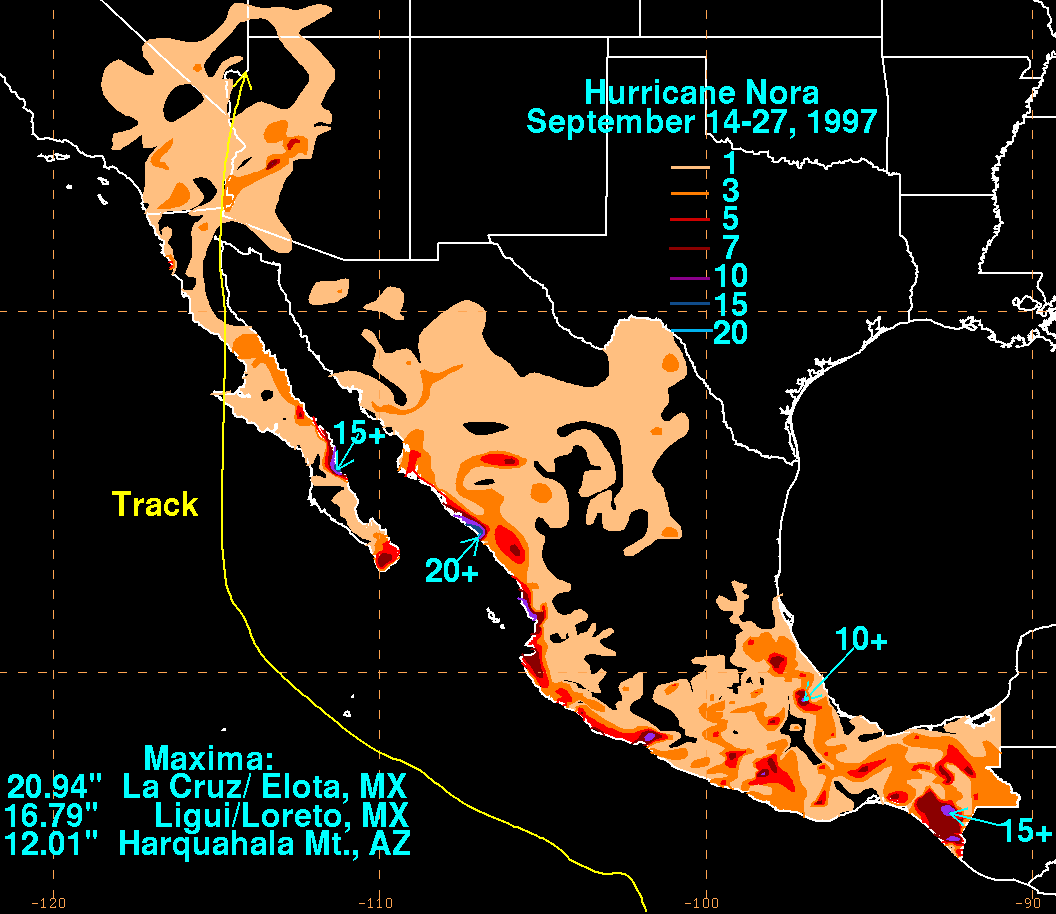
Nora rainfall totals for Mexico and the United States

Hurricane Nora impacted the majority of Mexico's Pacific-facing coast, as well as parts of the Southwestern United States, including California, Arizona, Utah and New Mexico. Overall the system was responsible for two deaths in Mexico and either three or four fatalities in the United States, as well as at least $150 million in damages.

=== Mexico ===
Hurricane Nora was the first of four tropical cyclones to impact Mexico during the latter part of the 1997 Pacific hurricane season, with Tropical Storm Olaf, Hurricanes Pauline and Rick impacting southern Mexico later in the season. The system impacted the majority of Mexico's Pacific coast with effects reported in Baja California, Colima, Guerrero, Jalisco, Michoacán, Nayarit, Oaxaca, Sinaloa and Sonora.

==== Southern Mexico ====
After Nora had become a tropical storm on 16 September, the Servicio Meteorológico Nacional (SMN) issued a hurricane watch for the coast between Lázaro Cárdenas, Michoacán and Cabo Corrientes, Jalisco, as it was feared that the system could make landfall on Mexico's Pacific coast. Later that day, the SMN issued a tropical storm warning for the area between Lázaro Cárdenas, Michoacán and Puntá Maldonado, Guerrero, in addition to the hurricane watch, because of the close proximity of the system to the coast. As a result, authorities set up evacuation centers on higher ground in case evacuations were ordered, while several major ports including Acapulco, Huatulco, Lazaro Cardenas and Zihuatanejo were closed to shipping or restricted to bigger vessels. Over the next couple of days, the tropical storm warning and hurricane watch was canceled and replaced with a flood warnings by the Mexican Government. Despite the system remaining over open waters, parts of Guerrero reported experiencing gusty winds and heavy rain from Nora's outer bands. The system also produced high seas, high surf and waves of up to 4.9 m (16 ft), which impacted parts of southwestern Mexico. As a result, property along the coastline was damaged, trees were brought down, while substantial beach erosion was reported with the Pie de la Cuesta beach washed away.

During 18 September, radar imagery from Acapulco showed that Nora's outer rain bands had started to impact Mexico's Pacific-facing coast.

Offshore, the strong swells generated by the hurricane caused widespread loss of growing sea lettuce (Ulva lactuca), exacerbating the negative biological effects of the 1997–98 El Niño event.

==== Oaxaca ====
The port of Huatulco was closed to small craft for at least four days as Nora caused high seas.

==== Guerrero ====
The ports of Acapulco and Zihuatanejo were closed to shipping for at least three days.

Heavy winds and rain were reported in the state.

High surf caused the beach at Pie de la Cuesta to virtually disappear.

==== Michoacán ====
The port at Lazaro Cardenas was closed to shipping.

==== Colima ====
In Colima Nora's storm surge produced waves of up to 13 ft (4 m).

80% of the arbours at the El Paraiso Balneario in Armería were destroyed.

==== Socorro and the Revillagigedo Islands ====
During 21 September, the Mexican Government issued a hurricane watch for the sparsely populated Revillagigedo Islands, before it was superseded by a hurricane warning later that day. Nora subsequently became the second hurricane in 10 days to pass near or over the island of Socorro, where winds of 50 mph (85 km/h) and a minimum pressure of 992.8 hPa (29.32 inHg) was reported.

Researchers investigating the maximum potential intensity of tropical cyclones near the island, later found that no useful atmospheric soundings were available to assess Nora's intensity while near the island.

Heavy winds and rain were reported in the states of Jalisco, Nayarit and Sinaloa. A rainfall total of 20.94 inches (532 mm) was recorded in La Cruz.

==== Baja California peninsula ====
During 23 September, the Mexican Government issued a tropical storm warning for the Baja California Peninsula for the areas to the south of 25°N and a hurricane watch for Baja California between 25°N and Punta Eugenia before they were extended northwards later that day. During the following day, the Mexican Government issued a hurricane warning between Bahia Balleno and Puerto Santo Tomás on the Pacific coast and from Santa Rosalía northwards on the Gulf of California side. They also issued a tropical storm warning from 24N northwards to Bahia Balleno and Santa Rosalía as well as a tropical storm watch between Puerto Santo Tomás northwards to Tijuana.

About 350–400 people were left homeless by floodwaters in the town of Arroyo de Santa Catarina in northern Baja California. A record-high two-day rainfall total of 409.5 mm (16.12 in) was set during the passage of Nora in San Felipe, on the northwestern shore of the Gulf of California. There, heavy damage and flooding were reported, as well as extensive beach erosion. Local roads and highways were destroyed and the town's dock was severely damaged.

The system subsequently started to impact Cabo San Lucas on the Baja California peninsula with heavy rain, strong winds and 15 ft (4.6 m) waves.

500 people were evacuated from their homes near Cabo San Lucas, Baja California Sur, and placed in shelters to prepare for the storm's impact. 9 feet (2.7 m) waves were reported in Cabo San Lucas.

Over 500 people from La Paz and surrounding areas were evacuated to emergency shelters.

Authorities ordered the evacuation of hundreds of people from flood-threatened coastal areas. In Mexicali, 69.9 mm (2.75 in) of rain was recorded as the hurricane passed, including 45.6 mm (1.80 in) in a 24-hour period. A person was electrocuted by a downed power line in Mexicali. The nearby New River overtopped its banks, flooding adjacent environs. In the aftermath of the system, troops patrolled flooded streets in Mexicali.

The death of a diver who had been harvesting sea urchins of the San Quintin Valley and had died of Nitrogen narcosis, was partially attributed by Mexican authorities to strong underwater currents created by Nora.

==== Sonora ====
During 24 September, the SMN issued a hurricane watch and a tropical storm warning for the eastern Gulf of California coast from Bahía Kino northwards. After Nora had moved into the Gulf of California during the next day, the watch and warning were discontinued, however, a tropical storm warning was briefly issued during 25 September for the coastline above 30N. Authorities in the towns of Puerto Peñasco, San Luis Río Colorado and Plutarco Elías Calles canceled schools and advised residents to stay home and avoid driving. In the town of Puerto Peñasco, it was suggested that most people were calm about the threat posed by Nora, with only a few people taking any precautions against the threat posed by flooding and strong winds. During 25 September, tropical storm force winds of up to 75 mph (120 km/h) were reported in the town, which caused trees to fall on power lines and prompted local officials to turn off the electric supplies.

Waves of up to 10 ft (3.0 m) impacted a seawall located offshore but did not topple the wall or cause any damage in the town.

At the height of the storm, approximately 300 people were staying in shelters at local schools.

=== United States ===
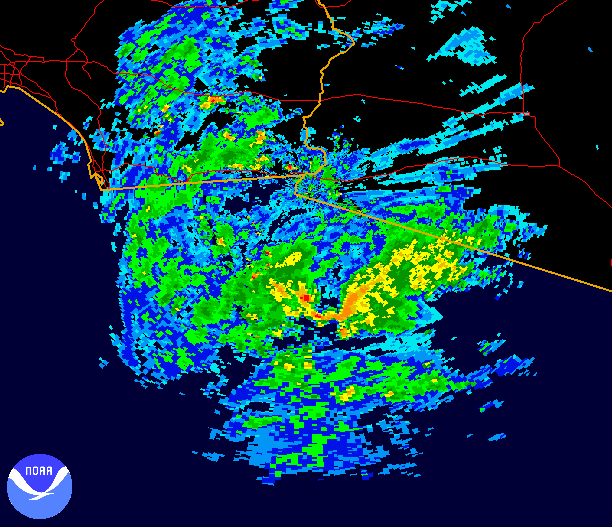
Radar imagery of Nora approaching the southwestern United States

Nora was the seventh named storm to impact the United States of America during 1997, after Ana, Claudette, Danny, Guillermo, Ignacio and Linda had impacted the country earlier in the season. Nora's threat to the United States was considered unusual and required an unprecedented coordination effort, between the National Hurricane Center (NHC) and various National Weather Service Weather Forecast Offices in the Western United States. It also prompted the Phoenix, Arizona Weather Forecast Office to issue a test hurricane local statement in order to determine the availability of the product to their family of services.

As Nora impacted Arizona and California, bird watchers observed and studied various rare seabirds, that were found along the Colorado River and the Salton Sea.

==== California ====
Nora was the fourth named storm to impact California during the 1997 Pacific hurricane season, after Guillermo, Ignacio and Linda had impacted the state earlier in the season. The system combined with high tides, an area of low pressure that moved into the Pacific Ocean from the desert, a strong northwesterly swell from a system in the Gulf of Alaska and the ongoing effects of the 1997–98 El Niño event to produce a variety of weather including high waves, unseasonable rainfall and dry hot winds across California. Ahead of the Nora impacting California, residents were warned that there was a chance that tropical storm force winds, would be experienced in Southern California despite Nora being expected to significantly weaken over land. They also warned that tropical moisture associated with the storm would bring showers and thunderstorms, which could produce locally heavy rainfall and increase the potential for flash flooding. It was also noted that heavy surf was not expected to pose any problems, with levels expected to remain well below levels produced by Hurricanes Guillermo or Linda.

During 24 September, the system started to impact California with high clouds, moisture and isolated thunderstorms reported over the state, which had the effect of causing hot temperatures, high humidity and enhancing wildfires over the state.

One wildfire resulting from arson became difficult to control due to dry easterly winds produced by the nearby hurricane.

Along the California coast, waves generated by Nora and the system over the Gulf of Alaska generally reached a height of 5–8 ft (1.5–2.4 m) with locally higher surf heights above 14 ft (4.3 m). The heavy surf resulted in minor coastal flooding. The high waves forced residents of oceanfront homes in Orange County to erect sandbag barriers. A drainage channel and berm were built in Seal Beach to redirect floodwaters oceanward and protect homes from the surf. There, 45 homes sustained minor damage and 3 homes sustained major damage as waves up to 20 ft (6.1 m) tall battered the coastal community.

Tropical moisture associated with the system produced unseasonable rainfall over California, with rainfall totals of between 0.13–4.70 in (3.3–119.4 mm) reported within the state; the peak rainfall total was recorded in Mount Laguna. This caused several places to record their first significant rainfall since April 1997, while 0.27 in (6.9 mm) of rain fell on Los Angeles which ended a record-setting dry spell that had lasted since 18 February. As a result of the rain, minor flooding was reported in the counties of Imperial, Inyo, Los Angeles, Orange, Riverside, San Bernardino, San Diego and Ventura. Within San Diego County, the worst flooding occurred in the North County area near Escondido Creek. In one locale, floodwaters rose as much as 2 ft (0.61 m) in 15 minutes. The flooding inundated low-lying roads and intersections. Several highways in the Coachella and Borrego Valleys to be closed due to flooding, while hundreds of automobile accidents caused traffic jams throughout San Diego and Orange Counties. The long dry spell that preceded Nora exacerbated the poor road conditions by allowing the build-up of grease and oil on roads. On the highways of Los Angeles and San Diego, the rain was responsible for over three times the usual amount of traffic accidents, while the California Highway Patrol attributed three traffic fatalities to Nora's rain. Five people were hospitalized with injuries in a separate traffic collision. In the 1–2 p.m. PST period, the California Highway Patrol logged 51 traffic incidents. Flooding caused minor damage in some neighborhoods in the Imperial Valley. Extensive damage valued at $4.5 million was inflicted on crops such as carrots and cotton in Imperial County as a result of the heavy rainfall and flooding.

Over 125,000 electricity customers were affected by power outages in the Los Angeles area as a result of the passing tropical cyclone, including 40,000 customers in the city proper. Winds associated with Hurricane Nora did not significantly impact California. However, cool moist winds associated with the system stifled a wildfire occurring on the Del Dios highway. Gusty winds also toppled telephone poles in Seeley. Rainfall from Nora also reduced large fire activity throughout southern California.

==== Arizona ====
Wettest tropical cyclones and their remnants in Arizona Highest-known totals
Precipitation			Storm	Location	Ref.
Rank	mm	in	Storm	Location	Ref.
1	344.4	13.56	Unnamed 1951	Crown King	
1	305.1	12.01	Nora 1997	Harquahala Mountains	
2	304.8	12.00	Octave 1983	Mount Graham	
3	289.6	11.40	Norma 1970	Workman Creek	
4	210.8	8.30	Heather 1977	Nogales	
5	209.8	8.26	Unnamed 1926	Hereford	
6	178.6	7.03	Unnamed 1939	Wikieup	
7	178.1	7.01	Doreen 1977	Yuma Valley	
8	177.8	7.00	Javier 2004	Walnut Creek	
9	166.9	6.57	Newton 2016	Rincon Mountains	
10	158.8	6.25	Norbert 2014	Tempe 3.1 WSW	

Hurricane Nora was the eighth tropical depression, fifth tropical storm and one of the overall strongest tropical cyclones on record to move into Arizona, since the start of the satellite era in 1965. Ahead of Nora impacting Arizona, it was predicted that the system could produce strong winds of between 55–60 mph (90–95 km/h) over the state, which was thought to be enough to cause patio furniture to go flying. The main threat though was thought to be from the rain, with rainfall totals of 2–5 in (51–127 mm) and isolated totals of 10 in (250 mm) expected in areas, where the average annual rainfall was about 3 in (76 mm). As a result, various flood watches and warnings were issued which caused the activation of various local and statewide response mechanisms, while concerns about flooding were very high in eastern Arizona after an unrelated storm had saturated the soils. These mechanisms included the declaration of a state of emergency for Yuma County by the then Governor of Arizona Jane Dee Hull, helicopters being placed on standby and the deployment of the Arizona National Guard to Yuma with various equipment. Residents of the state also took precautions as they stocked up on bottled water, food, flashlights and other emergency supplies, while others tied patio furniture and other potential missiles down. However, the Salt River Project refused to increase its flood storage capacities through emergency reservoir releases, as the reservoirs were nowhere near full and could cope with the expected flooding.

Nora moved into the state on 25 September as a weakening tropical storm and deviated from its forecast track, which meant that eastern and central parts of the state including Tucson received only minimal rainfall and breezy conditions. As Nora moved into the state, a 45 mi (75 km) band of hurricane-force winds was observed on the Yuma doppler radar, which caused tropical storm force winds of between 50–60 mph (80–95 km/h) to be reported in Yuma and Pima counties. These winds tore off shingles and awnings from houses, while street signs, traffic lights and powerlines were blown away which in turn caused about 10 000 people to lose power in Yuma. The system was also responsible for a significant rainfall event over parts of western and northern Arizona, with rainfall totals of 1–4 inches (25–102 mm) widely reported, while a rainfall total of 12.01 inches (305 mm) was reported on the Harquahala Mountains broke the states 24-hour rainfall record set during Tropical Storm Norma in September 1970. As a result of the rain, significant flooding and runoff events were reported on several washes in Wickenburg, as well as on the Centennial Wash, Hassayampa River, Jackrabbit Wash and Tiger Wash. The most notable of these runoff events took place on the Centennial Wash where the Narrows Dam suffered two large breaches, which as a result caused a torrent of water to surge through Aguila after an earthen dam protecting the city gave way. As a result, 35 farm workers had to be evacuated to a middle school in Wickenburg from their homes on the Martori Farms complex, while around 300–500 acres (120–200 ha) of melons and approximately half of the cotton crop on the farm were destroyed. The counties of La Paz, Maricopa and Mohave subsequently declared that an emergency existed in Aguila, which allowed them to receive state funds. The combination of torrential rainfall and preexisting groundwater-related subsidence led to the opening of a fissure in the Harquahala Plain 70 mi (110 km) west of Phoenix. The fissure was 4,400 ft (1,300 m) long, 10 ft (3.0 m) wide, and 5 ft (1.5 m) deep. It was later estimated that Nora had caused around $3 million in damages to both local government and state property as well as $150 to $200 million of damage to crops.

==== Utah ====
Ahead of moisture associated with Nora impacting Utah, forecasters warned that it wasn't a good weekend to go hiking in Utah's narrow canyons and predicted that the system could produce around 1–3 in (25–76 mm) of rain over southern parts of the state. Within the state, it was feared that heavy rain would cause flash flooding and that streams and rivers, would suddenly and unexpectedly rise if tropical moisture associated with Nora impacted the area. As a result, flash flood watches and warnings were issued for Southern Utah during 25 September, while emergency services in Kane and Washington Counties provided sandbags to fire departments which were subsequently handed out for free to residents. Nora's remnant upper-level circulation moved into Utah during 25 September, where it produced a period of near hurricane-force winds that were observed at the Blowhard Mountain radar site, near Cedar City. The winds were also thought to be responsible for producing straight-line winds, which downed or sheared the tops of approximately 400 trees off in the Dixie National Forest, Brian Head Ski Resort and the Cedar Breaks National Monument. The falling trees damaged three condominiums in Brian Head, injured an archaeologist camping in Cedar Breaks and disrupted the power supply in both areas. Nora also produced rain over the state, with a maximum rainfall total of 2.21 in (56.1 mm) reported in Enterprise. This had the effect of producing significant rises in washes and streams, with some minor flooding reported in Rockville and across Utah State Route 9, while drinking water changed its color in the city of Hurricane, after flash flooding associated with Nora dumped sediment into the city's springs. It was later estimated that Nora had caused a total of $108 thousand in damages to crops and property in Utah.

==== Nevada ====
Ahead of the system impacting Nevada, the system was forecast to produce 1–4 in (25–102 mm) of rain over the Las Vegas Valley, which prompted the Clark County Flood Control District to move 3 million sandbags to the valley from the Fallon Air Force Base. As the system moved into Nevada, the Las Vegas Radar showed that the system had a small area of 45–50 mph (75–85 km/h) winds over the Spring Mountains, however, surface observations showed that these winds were not experienced at the lower levels of Nevada. Rain was also recorded over the state with an 1 in (25 mm) of rain recorded over much of southern Nevada, while a maximum rainfall total of 3.53 in (90 mm) was recorded on Mount Charleston, Kyle Canyon. Flooding within the state was not as severe as expected, with only minor street flooding reported in Las Vegas and the Pahrump Valley. Access to some outlying homes in Pahrump was cut-off as dirt roads became flooded and impassable, while several people were forced to stay at a shelter set up by the American Red Cross. On 25 September, a person was killed while another was critically injured, when they skidded into the side of a tractor-trailer while traveling northwards near Railroad pass. Inclement conditions produced by Nora may have contributed the crash of a private Cessna 172K 10 mi (16 km) west of Jean, Nevada, on September 25, killing the plane's sole occupant; the plane had taken off from Bishop, California, en route to Boulder City, Nevada, and was scud running due to a low cloud ceiling before descending to land. The National Transportation Safety Board later determined that the pilot's decision to fly into adverse weather and failure to maintain sufficient clearance above the mountainous terrain led to the crash of the plane into the side of a ridge rising roughly 3,000 ft (910 m) above mean sea level.

==== New Mexico ====
On 23 September, the American Red Cross chapter in New Mexico issued a media release, which stated that Nora would produce 6–12 in (150–300 mm) of rain over the state and suggested that the central part of the state near Belen was most at risk as heavy rain had previously fallen there. As a result, they suggested that people prepare by elevating their furniture and other valuables to areas where they wouldn't be impacted by flood waters and announced that they were prepared to open shelters for residents and emergency workers. Forecasters from the National Weather Service stated that the Red Cross rainfall estimates were overestimates and predicted that the remnants might produce up to 2 in (51 mm) of rain in the northwest of the state, while other parts of the state might see some showers or no rain at all from Nora. The Red Cross later acknowledged that their estimates were made in error after they had misinterpreted information from the National Red Cross about the impact of the system. Emergency services in the north-western part of the state prepared themselves in case heavy rain caused any flooding and prompted evacuations and/or search and rescue missions. Firefighters in San Juan County also issued sandbags and advised people to only use them on openings at the surface level. There were no impacts reported in New Mexico from Nora after the system had moved more west than forecast, however, it left twice the normal amount of moisture in the air over the four-corners area which eventually condensed into rain-producing clouds.

== See also ==
- Other storms of the same name
- List of Baja California Peninsula hurricanes
- List of Arizona hurricanes
- List of California hurricanes
- List of Nevada hurricanes
- Hurricane Kathleen (1976)
- Tropical Storm Octave (1983)
- Hurricane Norbert (2014)
- Hurricane Newton (2016)
- Hurricane Rosa (2018)
- Hurricane Hilary (2023)
- Hurricane Rachel (2026)
