= List of storms named Rosa =

The name Rosa has been used for seven tropical cyclones in the Eastern Pacific Ocean.

- Hurricane Rosa (1978) – threatened Baja California.
- Tropical Storm Rosa (1982) – brushed southwestern Mexico.
- Hurricane Rosa (1994) – struck Mexico, killing 4.
- Tropical Storm Rosa (2000) – made landfall in Mexico as a weak tropical storm, causing minimal damage.
- Tropical Storm Rosa (2006) – never threatened land.
- Tropical Storm Rosa (2012) – never threatened land.
- Hurricane Rosa (2018) – made landfall in Baja California as a tropical depression; affected the southwestern United States.

The name Rosa has been used for one tropical cyclone in the Australian region.

- Cyclone Rosa (1979) – struck northern Australia.
