= Hurricane Rosa (1994) =

Category 2 Pacific hurricane in 1994

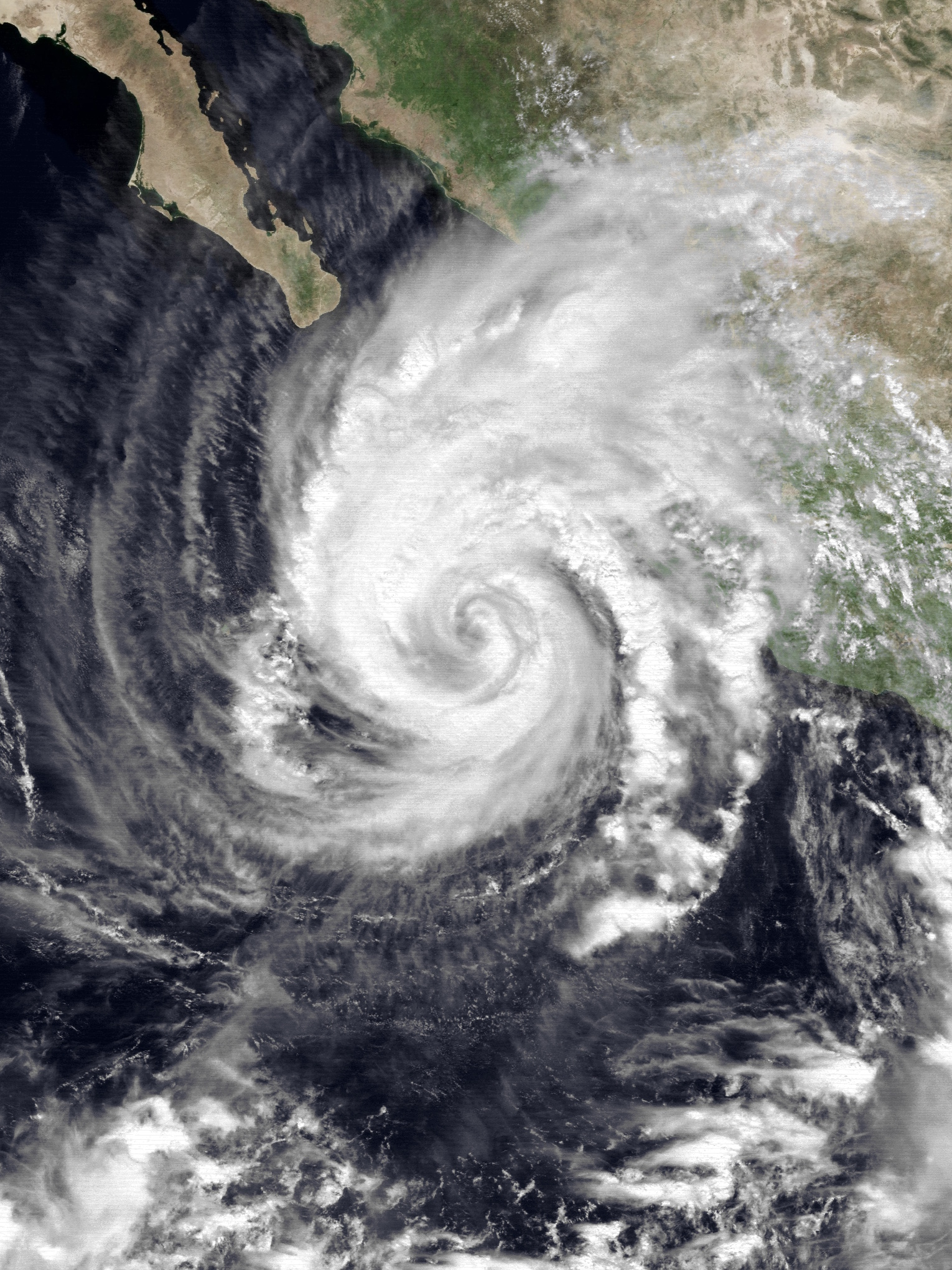
- Rosa near peak intensity off the southwest coast of Mexico on October 13

Meteorological history
- Formed: October 8, 1994
- Dissipated: October 15, 1994

Category 2 hurricane
- 1-minute sustained (SSHWS/NWS)
- Highest winds: 105 mph (165 km/h)
- Lowest pressure: 974 mbar (hPa); 28.76 inHg

Overall effects
- Fatalities: 4–30 direct
- Damage: $700 million (1994 USD)
- Areas affected: Southwestern Mexico, Western Mexico, Southwestern United States, Texas
- IBTrACS
- Part of the 1994 Pacific hurricane season

Hurricane Rosa was the only Pacific hurricane to make landfall during the above-average 1994 Pacific hurricane season. It killed at least 4 people in Mexico. Moisture from the hurricane was a factor in widespread flooding in the U.S. state of Texas that killed 22 people and caused hundreds of millions of dollars in damage in October 1994. The pre-Rosa tropical depression formed on October 8 before degenerating the next day. It reformed on October 10 and steadily strengthened as it approached Mexico. Ultimately peaking as a Category 2 hurricane on the Saffir-Simpson Hurricane Scale right before landfall, Rosa was the final hurricane, nineteenth tropical storm, and second-last tropical cyclone of the 1994 Pacific hurricane season.

== Meteorological history ==
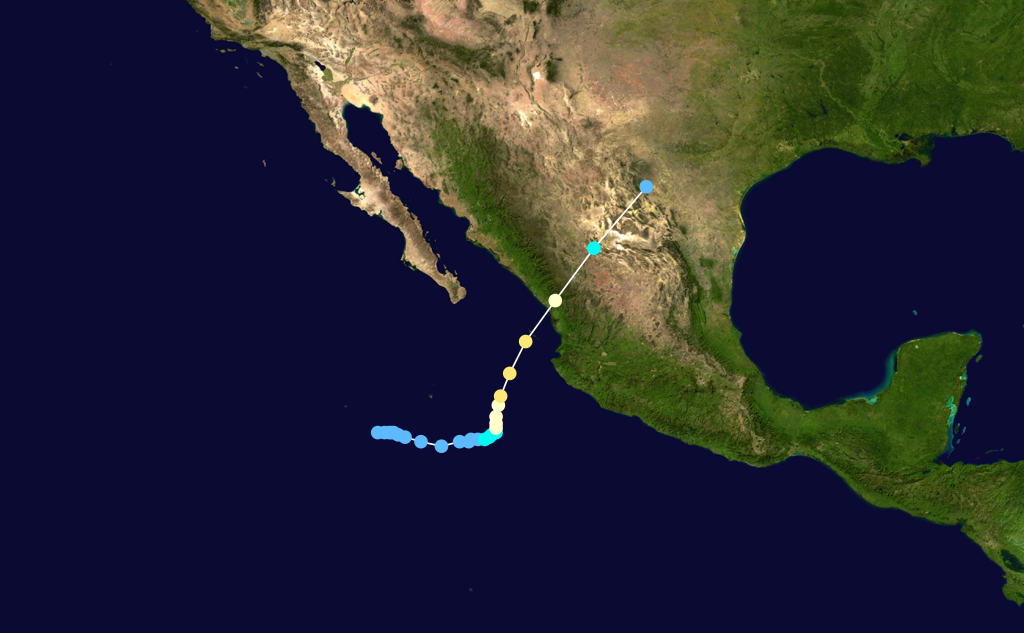
Map plotting the storm's track and intensity, according to the Saffir–Simpson scale Map key Saffir–Simpson scale Tropical depression (≤38 mph, ≤62 km/h) Tropical storm (39–73 mph, 63–118 km/h) Category 1 (74–95 mph, 119–153 km/h) Category 2 (96–110 mph, 154–177 km/h) Category 3 (111–129 mph, 178–208 km/h) Category 4 (130–156 mph, 209–251 km/h) Category 5 (≥157 mph, ≥252 km/h) Unknown Storm type Tropical cyclone Subtropical cyclone Extratropical cyclone, remnant low, tropical disturbance, or monsoon depression

On October 8, a circulation associated with an area of disturbed weather acquired convection and was designated Tropical Depression Nineteen-E. Upon formation, the depression was forecast to dissipate because of strong wind shear. Moving little, its development was constantly hindered by wind shear. The depression had difficulty organizing, and on October 9, it became so disorganized that advisories were discontinued.

The depression's remnants moved eastward and interacted with an area of disturbed weather. This regenerated the convection, and the depression regenerated on October 10, possibly with a new center of circulation. However, the National Hurricane Center's preliminary report does not indicate that the depression ever dissipated or regenerated. Moving little in a favorable environment, the depression was upgraded to Tropical Storm Rosa on October 11, and to hurricane status a day later. At the time it was about 345 miles (555 km) south of the southern tip of the Baja California Peninsula. Rosa continued drifting slowly for another day and a half. Then, a trough caused Rosa to begin moving and accelerate north-northeastward. On October 14, Rosa peaked in intensity as a Category 2 hurricane on the Saffir-Simpson Hurricane Scale with winds of 100 mph (160 km/h) and a central pressure of 974 mb (974 hPa). A few hours later, Rosa made landfall near La Concepción about 70 mi (110 km) south-southeast of Mazatlán. Rosa's circulation weakened over the mountains, and it dissipated on October 15.

== Preparations, impact, and aftermath ==
Costliest Pacific hurricanes
Rank	Cyclone	Season	Damage	Ref
1	5 Otis	2023	$12–16 billion	
2	1 Manuel	2013	$4.2 billion	
3	4 Iniki	1992	$3.1 billion	
4	3 John	2024	$2.45 billion	
5	4 Odile	2014	$1.82 billion	
6	TS Agatha	2010	$1.1 billion	
7	4 Hilary	2023	$948 million	
8	5 Willa	2018	$825 million	
9	1 Madeline	1998	$750 million	
10	2 Rosa	1994	$700 million	

On October 12, a hurricane watch was issued for the coast from Culiacán to Manzanillo and the Baja California Peninsula south of latitude 24°N. At the same time, a tropical storm warning was issued from Manzanillo to Tepic. On October 14, a hurricane warning was issued for the coast between Culiacán and Cabo Corrientes, and a tropical storm warning south of Cabo Corrientes to Manzanillo. All watches and warnings were lifted later that day.

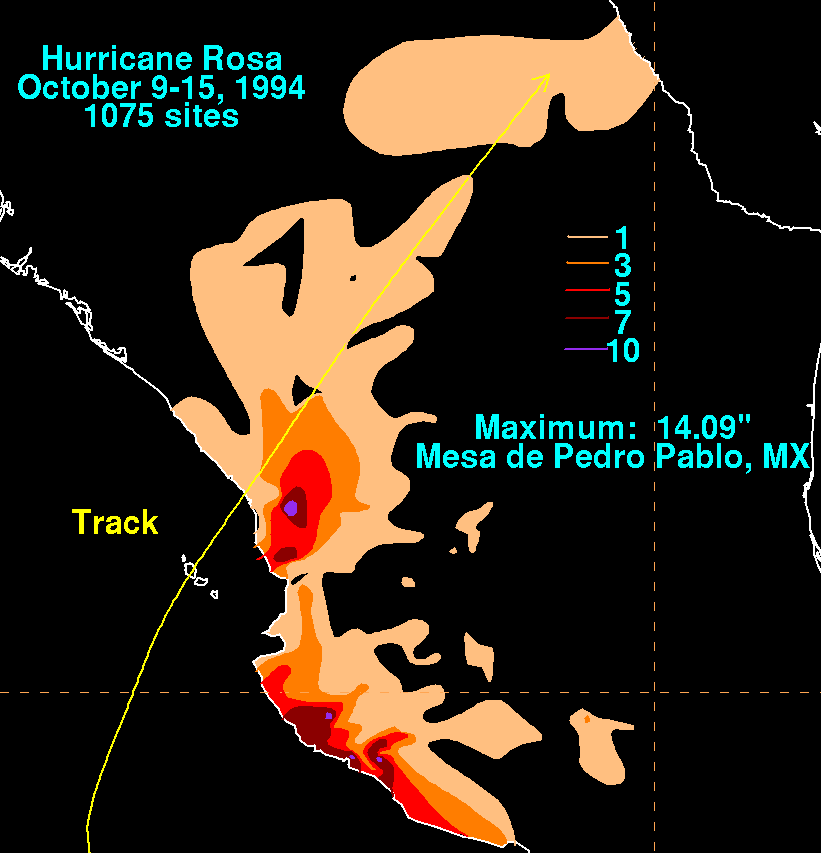
Rosa's rainfall map, Mexico only

On October 13 and 14, two ships, the London Spirit and the Marie Maersk, encountered winds of tropical storm or hurricane force. The Marie Maersk was located especially close to the eye, and its observations were useful to forecasters.

In Nayarit and Durango, two people drowned, while in Sinaloa, four people were pronounced missing. More than 100,000 people in Nayarit had their homes damaged. Rosa's winds damaged many telephone poles, power lines, and houses in Sinaloa. Rainfall between 3 and 5 inches (76 and 127 mm) caused many landslides in mountainous areas. Mudslides forced the evacuation of 400 people from two coastal villages in Jalisco. Rosa dumped rain over parts of coastal and inland Mexico; the highest rainfall total was 14.09 in (358 mm) at Mesa de Pedro Pablo.

Rosa sent moisture into the United States, which, in combination with humidity drawn north from the Gulf of Mexico, caused heavy thunderstorms and flooding in parts of thirty eight Texas counties on October 15 to 19. The flooding was worst around the San Jacinto and Trinity River basins, and in coastal areas. Rainfall totals ranged from 8 in (200 mm) to more than 28 in (710 mm). The rain levels caused 100-year floods at nineteen stations. Several records were broken, some of which had stood since 1940. In the case of the Lavaca River near Edna, it broke a record set in 1936. The flooding destroyed 3069 homes, heavily damaged 6560, and damaged 6148 others. Railbeds and roads sustained damage, while broken gas and oil pipelines caused spills and environmental damage in the Lower San Jacinto River and Galveston Bay. Twenty-two people died due to effects from the storm. In total, the flooding in southeastern Texas caused 700 million (1995 USD) in damage. On October 18, the Federal Emergency Management Agency (FEMA) declared the worst-affected areas a disaster area. After the declaration, FEMA received 26,000 applications for disaster assistance and approved 54 million (1995 USD) in aid.

== See also ==
- Other storms named Rosa
- List of Pacific hurricanes
