= Puerto Santo Tomás, Baja California =

Village in Baja California, Mexico

- Village
- Pueblo de Puerto Santo Tomás; Village of Puerto Santo Tomas
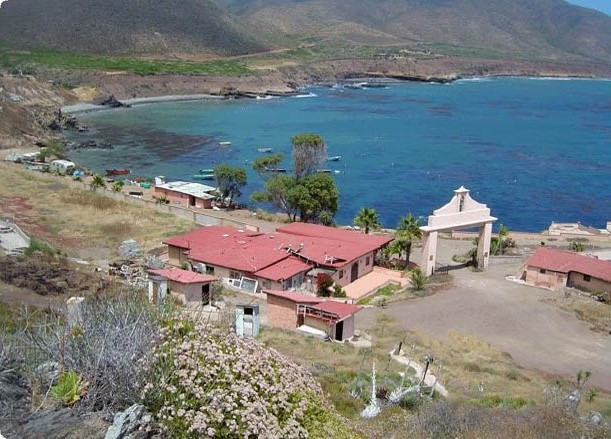
- Puerto Santo Tomás, Baja California, Mexico coastline with Puerto Santo Tomas Resort in the foreground.

- Location in Mexico Puerto Santo Tomás (Mexico)
- Coordinates: 31°33′16.1″N 116°40′45.4″W
- Country: Mexico
- State: Baja California
- Municipality: Ensenada
- Time zone: UTC−8 (PST)
  - Summer (DST): UTC−7 (PDT)
- Postal code: 22795
- Area code: 646

Puerto Santo Tomás is a coastal village in the Ensenada Municipality of Baja California, Mexico. It is the site of Los Angeles Times columnist Jack Smith's leased house and the setting for his 1974 memoir God And Mr. Gomez.
