= Hurricane Rachel (2026) =

Category 3 Pacific hurricane in 2026

- Rachel at peak intensity on October 1

Meteorological history
- Formed: September 27, 2026
- Post-tropical: October 11, 2026
- Dissipated: October 12, 2026

Category 3 major hurricane
- 1-minute sustained (SSHWS/NWS)
- Highest winds: 120 mph (195 km/h)
- Lowest pressure: 950 mbar (hPa); 28.05 inHg

Overall effects
- Fatalities: 8
- Damage: $200 million (2026 USD)
- Areas affected: Pacific Coast of Mexico; Baja California Peninsula; Western United States
- Part of the 2026 Pacific hurricane season and the 2026–27 North American winter

Hurricane Rachel was a strong and long-lived tropical cyclone that affected Baja California, Mexico, and Southern California, United States, in October 2026. Rachel was the twentieth named storm, tenth hurricane, and eighth major hurricane of the extremely active 2026 Pacific hurricane season. Originating from an area of low pressure south of Mexico, it developed into a tropical cyclone on September 27, reaching tropical storm status shortly afterward. Rachel steadily intensified as it moved northwest, becoming a hurricane early on September 30. By October 2, the hurricane peaked in intensity as a Category 3 major hurricane. Less favorable conditions caused Rachel to gradually weaken and fluctuate in intensity as it moved slowly westward, before abruptly turning northeast in response to an approaching trough. The cyclone continued weakening as it accelerated towards the Baja California peninsula, becoming post-tropical on October 11 as it affected parts of Southern California, before dissipating over the Rocky Mountains the following day.

The hurricane produced heavy rainfall and flash flooding that killed two people in Mexico. Rachel also prompted the second-ever issuing of a tropical storm watch for California, in addition to tropical storm warnings issued across the northern portion of Baja California. The remnants of Rachel moved into the Intermountain West on October 11, producing heavy rain across Utah and prompting flood watches. Additionally, tropical moisture from Rachel interacted with another low-pressure system and produced heavy snowfall in Montana, with parts of the state recording over 1 ft (0.30 m) of snow.

Rachel was estimated to have caused $200 million in damage.

== Meteorological history ==
Map plotting the storm's track and intensity, according to the Saffir–Simpson scale Map key Saffir–Simpson scale Tropical depression (≤38 mph, ≤62 km/h) Tropical storm (39–73 mph, 63–118 km/h) Category 1 (74–95 mph, 119–153 km/h) Category 2 (96–110 mph, 154–177 km/h) Category 3 (111–129 mph, 178–208 km/h) Category 4 (130–156 mph, 209–251 km/h) Category 5 (≥157 mph, ≥252 km/h) Unknown Storm type Tropical cyclone Subtropical cyclone Extratropical cyclone, remnant low, tropical disturbance, or monsoon depression

At 09:00 UTC on September 27, the NHC designated an area of low pressure as Tropical Depression Eighteen-E after having a closed circulation and organized convection. Later that day at 21:00 UTC, the depression strengthened into Tropical Storm Rachel. Rachel gradually strengthened over the next few days, moving northwestward off the coast of Mexico. It reached Category 1 strength at 06:00 UTC on September 30, becoming the tenth hurricane of the season. Rachel intensified into a Category 2 at 06:00 UTC on October 1. Favorable conditions allowed Rachel to further intensify into a Category 3 major hurricane, reaching peak intensity with 1-minute sustained winds of 120 mph (195 km/h) and a minimum pressure of 950 mbar (28.05 inHg).

Following peak intensity, Rachel would weaken slowly as it moved westward, remaining a hurricane for six more days while fluctuating in intensity. Rachel lost hurricane-strength winds on October 8, however it began to turn northeastward the following day towards Baja California. After fluctuating in intensity a bit, Rachel began to lose tropical characteristics as it accelerated, and the NHC declared Rachel a post-tropical cyclone just before it made landfall on the Baja California Peninsula, although the NHC continued issuing advisories until the threat subsided. The remnants of Rachel dissipated the following day on October 12 over the Rocky Mountains.

== Preparations ==
On October 9, the NHC issued a tropical storm watch for San Diego County, marking the second time that a watch had been issued for California, the only other occurrence being Hurricane Hilary in 2023. 15,000 sandbags were distributed in Long Beach, California ahead of the storm. Newport Beach closed all beaches and issued a state of emergency in advance of the storm. 100 people were evacuated in Tijuana as the storm approached, and the Port of Ensenada was also closed on the night of October 10 as Rachel approached. Additional impacts include the cancellation of the 2026 Moab 240 due to extreme trail conditions (broken aid stations, fallen trees, flash floods) where 70 runners and volunteers had to be rescued, but extra supplies delivered prior to the storm helped keep them safe.

== Impact ==
Rachel making landfall shortly after transitioning into a post-tropical cyclone on October 11

=== Mexico ===
Eight people were rescued by boat in Tijuana after being trapped by floodwaters on October 10. Across Ensenada, at least eight people died.

==== California ====
The heaviest rain in California came at Palomar Mountain, at 3.89 in (99 mm). Heavy rain also fell in the Inland Empire on October 10 and 11, with rainfall totals reaching 1.8 in (46 mm) in Indio and 1.71 in (43 mm) in Thermal. In California, Long Beach Mayor Rex Richardson stated that eight structures across 13 addresses were marked as unsafe to be occupied due to high surf and severe coastal erosion on October 10. Rachel left roads covered in mud and debris across parts of the Coachella Valley. There was between $4 million to $5 million in roadway damage. After the storm, portions of the Pacific Coast Highway in Laguna Beach was forced to close due to cracks in the road.

==== Elsewhere ====
Las Vegas broke their daily rainfall record for October 11 and tied their wettest October day on record with 1.08 in (27 mm) of rain. The storm caused flooded roads in both Las Vegas and Primm.

At Lake Havasu City Airport, sustained winds were recorded at 39 mph (63 km/h), with gusts up to 63 mph (101 km/h), as well as 1.08 in (27 mm) of rain.

Flooding forced a closure on Utah State Route 190 due to debris falling on the road. The destruction, including flash flooding and fallen trees, forced the first cancellation of the ongoing 2026 Moab 240 ultramarathon, in Moab, Utah. Snow was also observed in some mountains across the state. Over 9,500 customers across Utah lost power.

Tropical moisture from Rachel enhanced a significant winter storm over parts of Montana. Parts of the state saw over 1 ft (0.30 m) of snowfall from these storms, with up to 19 in (48 cm) reported in Checkerboard. Montana City reported 14 in (36 cm) of snow while 12 in (30 cm) of snow was reported in both Buffalo and Belgrade.

== See also ==
- Weather of 2026
- Tropical cyclones in 2026
- Other storms of the same name
- List of California hurricanes
  - Hurricane Hilary (2023) - The only other tropical cyclone on record to trigger tropical storm watches in California.
- List of Arizona hurricanes
- List of Nevada hurricanes
