= Hurricane Rosa (2018) =

Category 4 Pacific hurricane

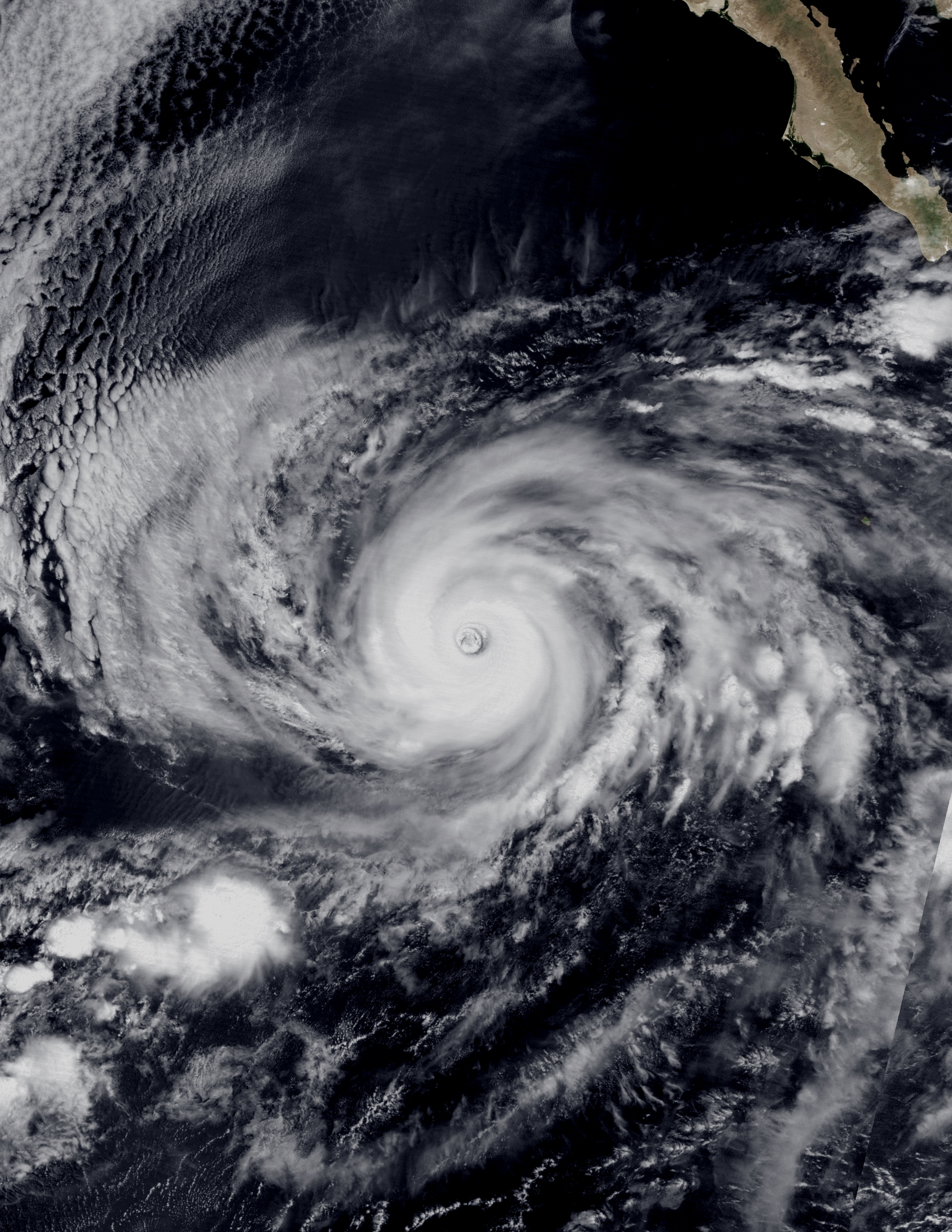
- Hurricane Rosa at peak intensity southwest of Baja California Sur on September 28

Meteorological history
- Formed: September 25, 2018
- Remnant low: October 2, 2018
- Dissipated: October 3, 2018

Category 4 major hurricane
- 1-minute sustained (SSHWS/NWS)
- Highest winds: 150 mph (240 km/h)
- Lowest pressure: 936 mbar (hPa); 27.64 inHg

Overall effects
- Fatalities: 4 total
- Damage: $51.9 million (2018 USD)
- Areas affected: Baja California Peninsula, Northwestern Mexico, Southwestern United States
- IBTrACS /
- Part of the 2018 Pacific hurricane season

Hurricane Rosa was a tropical cyclone that brought widespread flooding to northwestern Mexico and the Southwestern United States in late September 2018, and was the first tropical cyclone to make landfall in Baja California since Nora in 1997. The seventeenth named storm, tenth hurricane, and seventh major hurricane of the 2018 Pacific hurricane season; Rosa originated from an Atlantic tropical wave that crossed the West African coast on September 6. The wave proceeded westward across the Atlantic, traversing Central America before entering the Gulf of Tehuantepec on September 22. There, the weather system acquired cyclonic features and became a tropical storm on September 25. Within a favorable atmosphere, Rosa entered a period of rapid intensification on September 27, peaking as a Category 4 hurricane with maximum sustained winds of 150 mph (240 km/h) a day later. Over the next few days, Rosa turned north and then northeast while steadily weakening, making landfall in Baja California as a tropical depression on October 2. After crossing over into the Gulf of California, the remnant system split apart and merged with an upper-level low off the coast of California by October 3.

Rosa prompted the issuance of tropical storm watches and warnings along the coast of Baja California, as well as various flood watches and warnings throughout the Southwestern United States. The impact of Rosa was relatively minor, as a combination of wind shear and cooler seas had weakened the storm significantly by the time it made landfall. Widespread flooding throughout northwestern Mexico, mainly in Sonora and Baja California, led to one drowning and minor damage. Flash floods killed a driver near Meca, California. In Arizona, rainfall peaked at 6.89 in (175 mm) and caused flash floods that killed two people. Flood damage from Rosa and its remnants totaled $50 million (2018 USD) in the Southwestern United States and $1.88 million in Baja California.

== Meteorological history ==
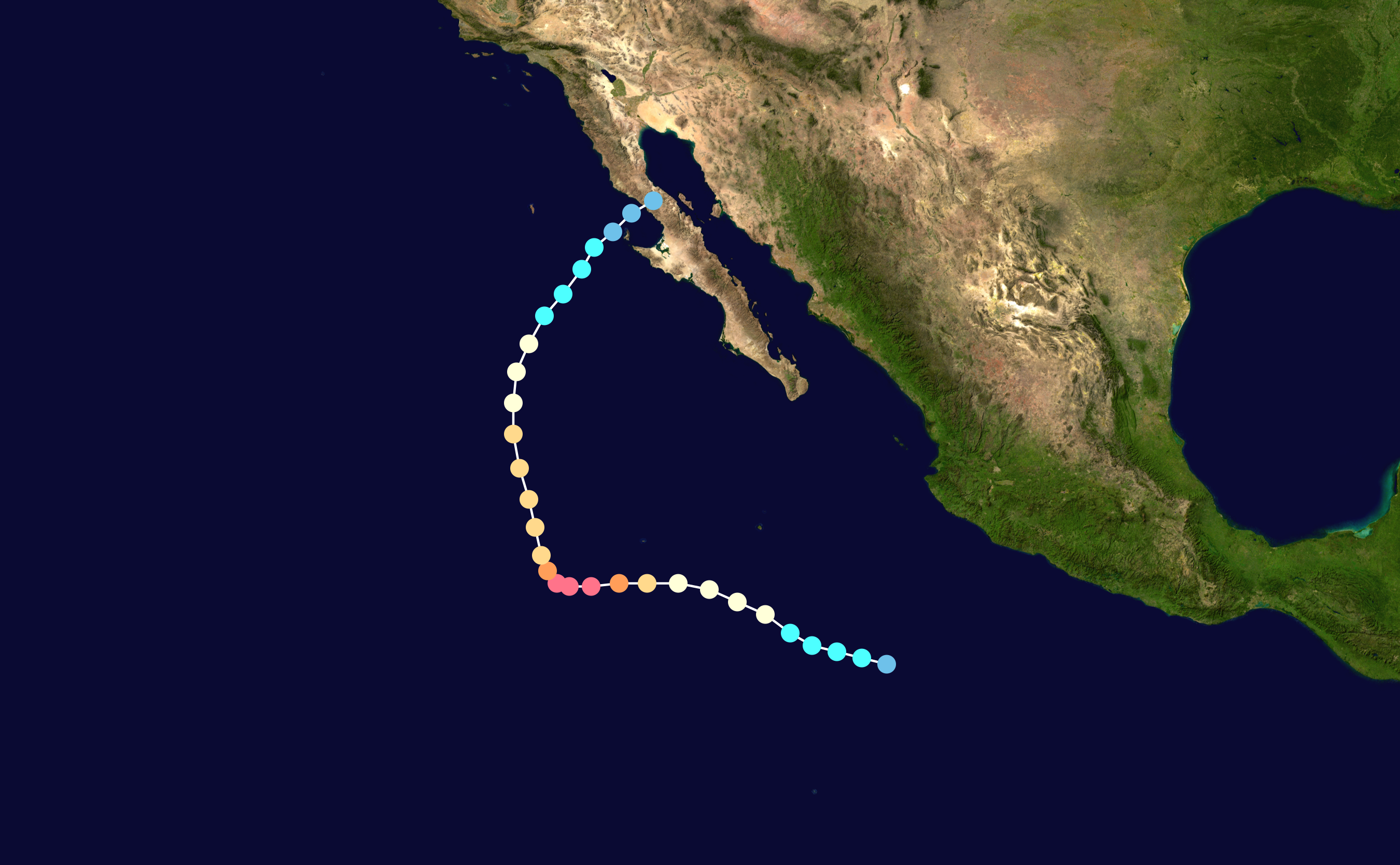
Map plotting the storm's track and intensity, according to the Saffir–Simpson scale Map key Saffir–Simpson scale Tropical depression (≤38 mph, ≤62 km/h) Tropical storm (39–73 mph, 63–118 km/h) Category 1 (74–95 mph, 119–153 km/h) Category 2 (96–110 mph, 154–177 km/h) Category 3 (111–129 mph, 178–208 km/h) Category 4 (130–156 mph, 209–251 km/h) Category 5 (≥157 mph, ≥252 km/h) Unknown Storm type Tropical cyclone Subtropical cyclone Extratropical cyclone, remnant low, tropical disturbance, or monsoon depression

Hurricane Rosa originated from a vigorous tropical wave that departed from the west coast of Africa on September 6. The wave traveled across the tropical Atlantic with minimal associated convection and became difficult to track after interacting with a mid-level trough in the Caribbean Sea. The National Hurricane Center (NHC) issued a Tropical Weather Outlook on September 19, anticipating that an area of low pressure would form in the Gulf of Tehuantepec over the weekend. The wave crossed Central America and entered the gulf on September 22, where it produced a surface circulation with convective activity aloft. Though broad in structure, the system consolidated as it proceeded slightly north of west. It was officially classified as Tropical Depression Twenty-E on September 25, at 06:00 UTC, located 350 mi (560 km) south-southwest of Manzanillo, Mexico.

At the time of its formation, the depression was located within a favorable tropospheric environment of warm sea surface temperatures and minimal vertical wind shear, featuring a well-defined center of circulation under an expanding area of strong convection. The depression maintained a trend of steady strengthening over the 24 hours: it was upgraded to Tropical Storm Rosa six hours after being classified, and became the tenth hurricane of the season a day later, at 12:00 UTC on September 26. The NHC remarked that Rosa's structure was well developed at the middle levels of the troposphere, with distinct rainbands wrapped around the southern semicircle of the cyclone. The hurricane leveled in intensity for eighteen hours before proceeding into another phase of rapid intensification; it reached major hurricane status at 18:00 UTC on September 27, peaking in intensity with maximum sustained winds of 150 mph (240 km/h) and a minimum central pressure of 936 mbar (27.6 inHg). This made Rosa the seventh Category 4 hurricane of the year's season.

After Rosa reached its peak, the hurricane's eyewall – an inner ring of clouds around the eye, marked by high winds – began to warm considerably, signaling the start of an eyewall replacement cycle. Rosa turned to the northwest on the afternoon of September 28 in response to an approaching mid- to upper-level trough, which would continue to influence the remainder of the hurricane's development. Now tracking over cooler seas, Rosa steadily weakened down to Category 2 by 00:00 UTC, September 29, while undergoing its eyewall replacement. Once the replacement cycle was completed, the storm briefly restrengthened because of its much-improved structure, with expanding outflow to the northeast of the eye. However, Rosa began to experience impinging wind shear from the developing trough, causing a misalignment between the upper and lower levels of the hurricane, as well as coinciding with a final weakening phase.

Rosa turned to the north on September 29, ahead of the trough. The unrelenting wind shear – combined with progressively cooler seas and drier air – quickly eroded Rosa's core, disrupting the eye and convection over the southern half of the hurricane. At 12:00 UTC on September 30, the diminishing hurricane dropped to Category 1 while being steered towards the northeast between the trough and a subtropical ridge. Rosa lost its hurricane status twelve hours later, proceeding towards the Baja California Peninsula as a tropical storm. It further weakened to a tropical depression on October 2, after the convection became displaced from the elongating center. At 11:00 UTC on October 2, Rosa made landfall about 70 mi (110 km) southeast of Punta San Antonio in Baja California, becoming the first tropical cyclone to move over the state since Nora of 1997. During its approach towards the Gulf of California, Rosa exhibited an increasingly unwound and diffuse structure, prompting the NHC to declassify it as a tropical cyclone at 15:00 UTC. Shortly after, forecasters at the Weather Prediction Center (WPC) noted that the low- and mid-level circulations of Rosa's remnant had decoupled; the mid-level remnants proceeded into northeast Arizona, while the lower segment traced behind it over the Gulf of California. On October 3, in their final advisory on the system, the WPC reported that the remnants had been absorbed into a deepening non-tropical low off the coast of California.

== Preparations, impact, and aftermath ==
=== Mexico ===
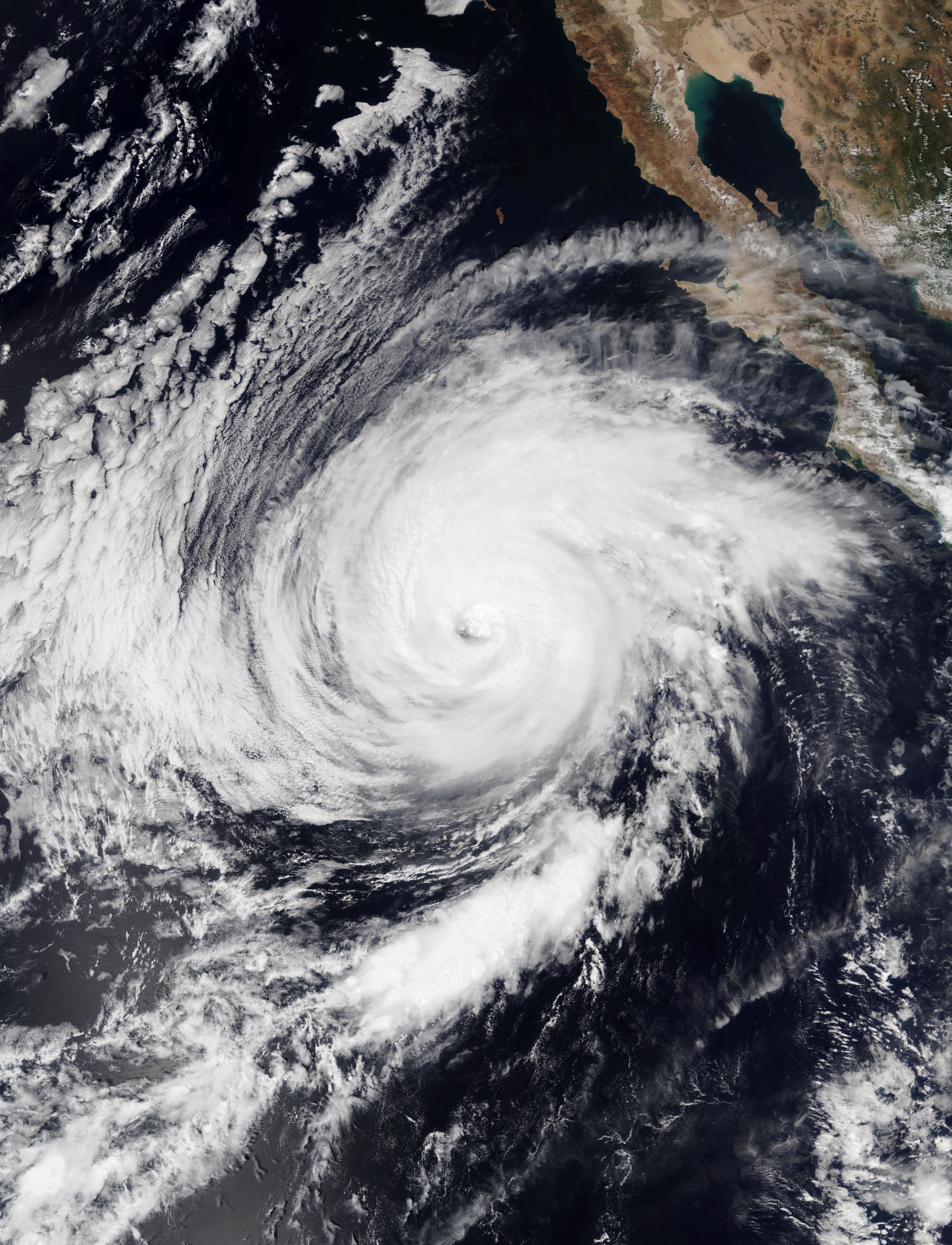
Hurricane Rosa approaching the Baja California Peninsula on September 29

The Government of Mexico issued a tropical storm watch on September 29 for the Pacific Coast of the Baja California Peninsula from Punta Abreojos to Cabo San Quintín. The watches on the west coast of Baja California were changed to tropical storm warnings, and watches were issued for the east coast of Baja California from Bahía de los Angeles to San Felipe on the next day. All the watches and warnings were discontinued after Rosa weakened to a tropical depression. The State Unit of Civil Protection of Sonora issued a yellow alert (imminent severe weather) for 11 municipalities and a green alert (possible severe weather) for 19 municipalities on September 30. A red alert was issued for San Felipe on October 1 as Rosa approached Baja California. On the same day, schools were closed in several communities throughout Baja California as well as in the neighboring state of Sonora. The Marine Plan, an evacuation and rescue plan, was activated in the states of Baja California, Baja California Sur, Sonora, and Sinaloa.

Because of its significant weakening before landfall, Rosa had a relatively minor impact in Mexico. Rainfall was heaviest in Baja California, peaking at 166 mm (6.54 in) in Percebu and at 137 mm (5.39 in) in San Felipe. A rainfall total of 2.6 in (67 mm) occurred in Sonoyta, Sonora, near the US-Mexico border. Floods in San Felipe collapsed part of a highway and opened up a sinkhole in the city's port. The port suffered MX$10 million (US$530,000) in losses following a five-day shutdown of its operations. Rosa caused widespread coastal flooding near San Felipe and damaged archaeological sites. Damage across the Baja California amounted to MX$35.4 million (US$1.88 million). In Los Cabos, Baja California Sur, rainstorms triggered power outages and floods swept away vehicles. In Puerto Peñasco, Sonora, dozens of homes and businesses suffered from flooding after an estimated 100 mm (4 in) of rain fell. Many of the town's roads were closed, and four bridges became impassable. A woman drowned in Caborca, Sonora, after being swept away by floodwaters.

Farther south, in the state of Colima, floodwaters swept through the city of Manzanillo, causing sinkholes, rupturing underground pipes, and inundating buildings. Landslides in and around the city blocked roads and buried three vehicles in mud. Throughout the state of Michoacán, the combined effects from Rosa and nearby Tropical Storm Sergio destroyed 35,000 ha (86,000 acres) of crops. After Rosa's passage, states of emergency were issued for the cities of Ensenada, Mexicali, and Puerto Peñasco.

=== United States ===
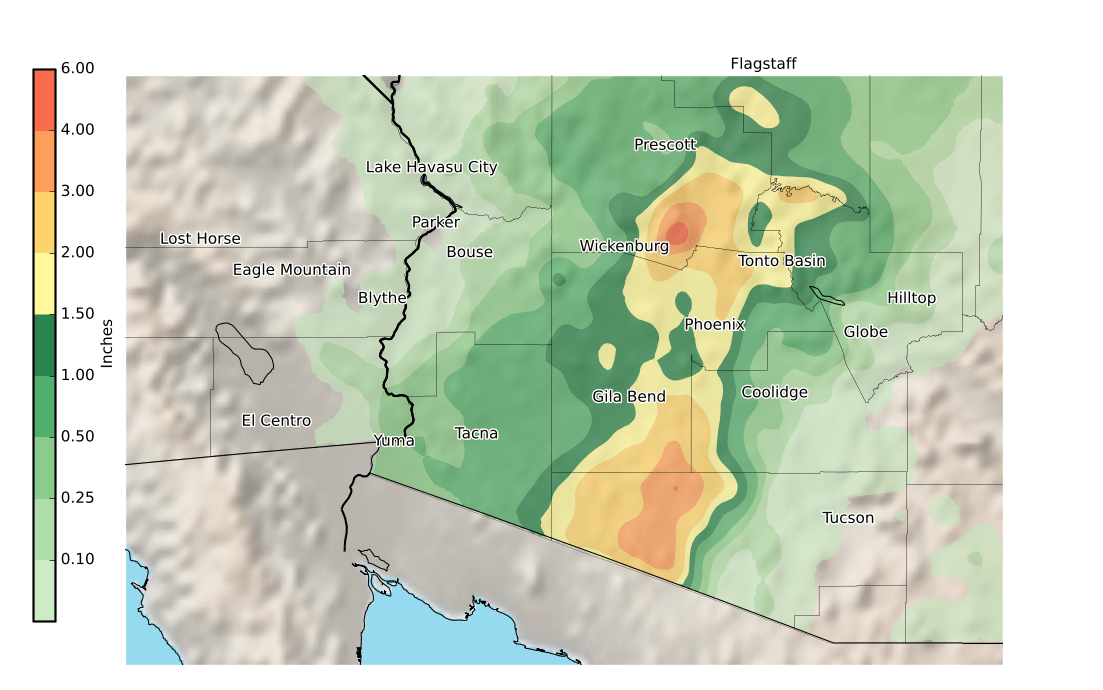
Rainfall totals for the second round of rain generated by Rosa's remnants, which lasted from October 1–2.

Exiting the Gulf of California, the remnants of Rosa tracked northward, spawning showers and thunderstorms in the Four Corners region. Damage from flooding in the Southwestern United States totaled about $50 million (USD). Flood watches and warnings were issued on September 30 for Southern California, Arizona, southwest Colorado, Utah, central Nevada, and a small portion of southeast Idaho. Rosa dropped 5.9 in (150 mm) of rain on a two week old, 240 mi^{2} (610 km^{2}) burn scar in central Utah. Samples taken from streams that received rainfall from Rosa showed that the wildfires had lowered the level of carbon, nitrogen, and phosphorus. In the Coachella Valley in southern California, thunderstorms produced flash floods that swept away a vehicle, killing its driver. On October 1, an interaction between Rosa's remnants and a Pacific low produced severe thunderstorms in San Bernardino County, California. Surging floodwaters carried rocks onto portions of U.S. Route 95 and coated parts of state routes 62 and 127 in mud and debris. Effects from the severe weather extended into Nevada, where flash floods inundated buildings and deposited rubble along Pioche's Main Street.

By the time of Rosa's absorption on October 3, a total of 6.89 in (175 mm) of rain was recorded at Towers Mountain, Arizona, located about 85 mi (137 km) north of Phoenix; other areas throughout the state reported up to 5.5 in (140 mm) of rain. The remnants of Rosa caused flash floods throughout the communities of Guadalupe, Glendale, Scottsdale, Fountain Hills, Deer Valley, and Sun City and knocked out power in Yuma. As rainfall exceeded 2 in (50 mm), the National Weather Service issued a flash flood warning for the Phoenix area. Though over two dozen roads, as well as schools and businesses, had been closed, 80 car accidents occurred during the torrential rains. Outside the Phoenix area, weather-related traffic accidents resulted in the deaths of a 26-year-old woman just north of Cameron and a 34-year-old man in Kingman.

At Menagers Dam near Sells, Arizona, rainfall from Rosa brought the water level within 1 foot (0.30 m) of maximum capacity on October 2, raising concerns about the dam's structural integrity. Saying dam failure was imminent, the National Weather Service in Tucson urged residents of Ali Chuk to evacuate immediately. Later that day, 162 people were evacuated from Ali Chuk, as well as 32 from Kohatk and 23 from the Menagers Dam community. Engineers were recruited to carry out assessments of the dam, and authorities continued to monitor the water level for two weeks before allowing residents to return to their homes on October 17. Water discharge rates on the Salt River reached 25,000 cu ft (710 m^{3}) per second, requiring officials to release water from the Tempe Town Lake.

The Federal Highway Administration announced on September 10, 2019, that it was providing $4.7 million to the state of Arizona to fund road and bridge repairs required as a result of Rosa. Road crews worked to repair a hillside along Arizona State Route 87 that was compromised as a result of heavy rainfall during Rosa. The project involved cleaning ditches, creating new ditches, removing landslide material, depositing boulders to prevent erosion, and repairing pavement; the cost was pegged at $4.2 million.

== See also ==
- Weather of 2018
- Tropical cyclones in 2018
- List of Category 4 Pacific hurricanes
- Other tropical cyclones named Rosa
- Lists of tropical cyclones by area:
  - List of Baja California hurricanes
  - List of Arizona hurricanes
  - List of California hurricanes
  - List of New Mexico hurricanes
- Hurricane Raymond (1989) – Category 4 hurricane that took a similar path, affected Baja California Sur as a tropical storm
- Hurricane Nora (1997) – Made landfall in Baja California as a Category 1 hurricane, and affected Arizona as a tropical storm
- Hurricane Javier (2004) – Category 4 hurricane that took a similar path, affected Baja California Sur as a tropical depression
