= Hurricane Hilary =

Category 4 Pacific hurricane in 2023

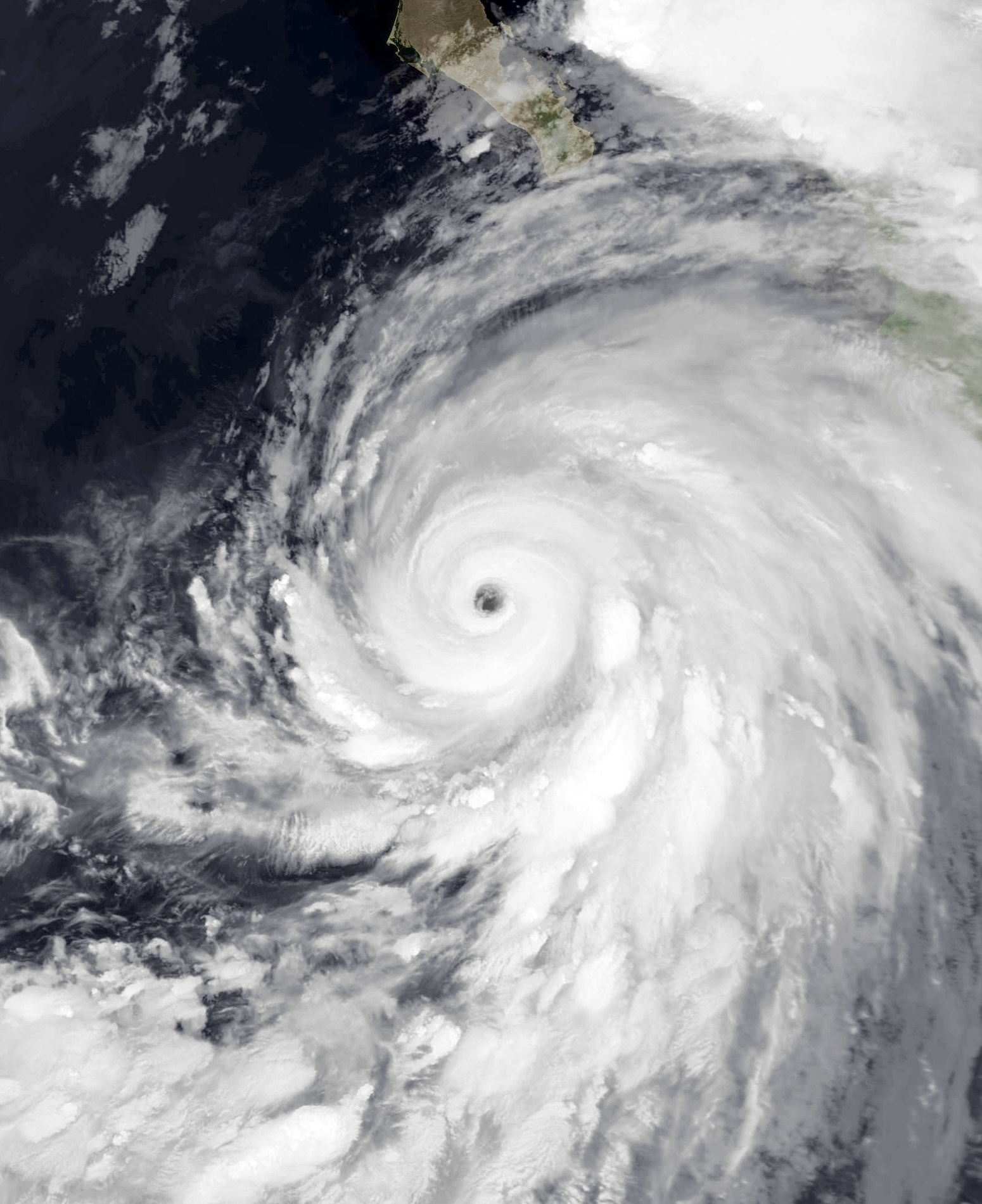
- Hilary near peak intensity while paralleling the western coast of Mexico on August 18

Meteorological history
- Formed: August 16, 2023
- Remnant low: August 20, 2023
- Dissipated: August 21, 2023

Category 4 major hurricane
- 1-minute sustained (SSHWS/NWS)
- Highest winds: 140 mph (220 km/h)
- Lowest pressure: 940 mbar (hPa); 27.76 inHg

Overall effects
- Fatalities: 4 total
- Damage: $948 million (2023 USD)
- Areas affected: Western Mexico, Revillagigedo Islands, Baja California peninsula, Western United States
- Part of the 2023 Pacific hurricane season

Hurricane Hilary was a large and intense Pacific hurricane in August 2023 that brought torrential rainfall and gusty winds to the Pacific Coast of Mexico along the Baja California peninsula, and the Southwestern United States, resulting in widespread flooding and mudslides to the region. The hurricane was the eighth named storm, sixth hurricane, and fourth major hurricane of the active and highly destructive 2023 Pacific hurricane season. (Note: A "major" hurricane is a hurricane that reaches Category 3 status or higher on the Saffir-Simpson hurricane scale.) Hilary originated from a tropical wave south of Mexico on August 16, and strengthened into a hurricane a day later while paralleling the southwest coast of Mexico. The system underwent rapid intensification, reaching maximum sustained winds of 140 mph (220 km/h) and a central pressure of 940 mbar (27.76 inHg) on August 18, making it a Category 4 on the Saffir-Simpson scale. After environmental conditions became unfavorable, Hilary weakened as it approached land, making landfall on August 20 as a tropical storm in San Quintín along the western Baja California peninsula. Hilary became a post-tropical cyclone over land, before being absorbed into a new non-tropical low-pressure area early on August 21.

The threat from Hurricane Hilary prompted widespread and varied preparations. In Mexico, thousands of people evacuated to shelters as ports closed along the coast. In anticipation of "catastrophic and life-threatening flooding", the National Hurricane Center (NHC) issued its first-ever tropical storm warning for Southern California, extending from the Mexico–United States border to just north of Los Angeles. The Weather Prediction Center and various National Weather Service offices issued forecasts related to the rainfall potential, affecting about 26 million people across Arizona, California, Nevada, and Utah.

In Mexico, the hurricane killed three people and left at least 854 million pesos (US$48 million) in damage. (Note: All currencies are in their 2023 values and are converted to USD using data from the International Monetary Fund published by the World Bank.) Power outages affected 315,929 people in the country, although most service was restored within four days. The storm left behind flooded roads, mudslides, and downed trees in the Baja California peninsula and in Southern California. Some areas of the latter region received up to 600% of their annual rainfall averages for the month of August. The floods killed one person in San Bernardino County. The estimated damage total in the United States was US$900 million, much of it in Inyo County, where most of the roads in Death Valley National Park were damaged by floodwaters. The park was closed for two months, its longest closure ever. Hilary broke records in four U.S. states for wettest tropical cyclone or its remnants.

== Meteorological history ==
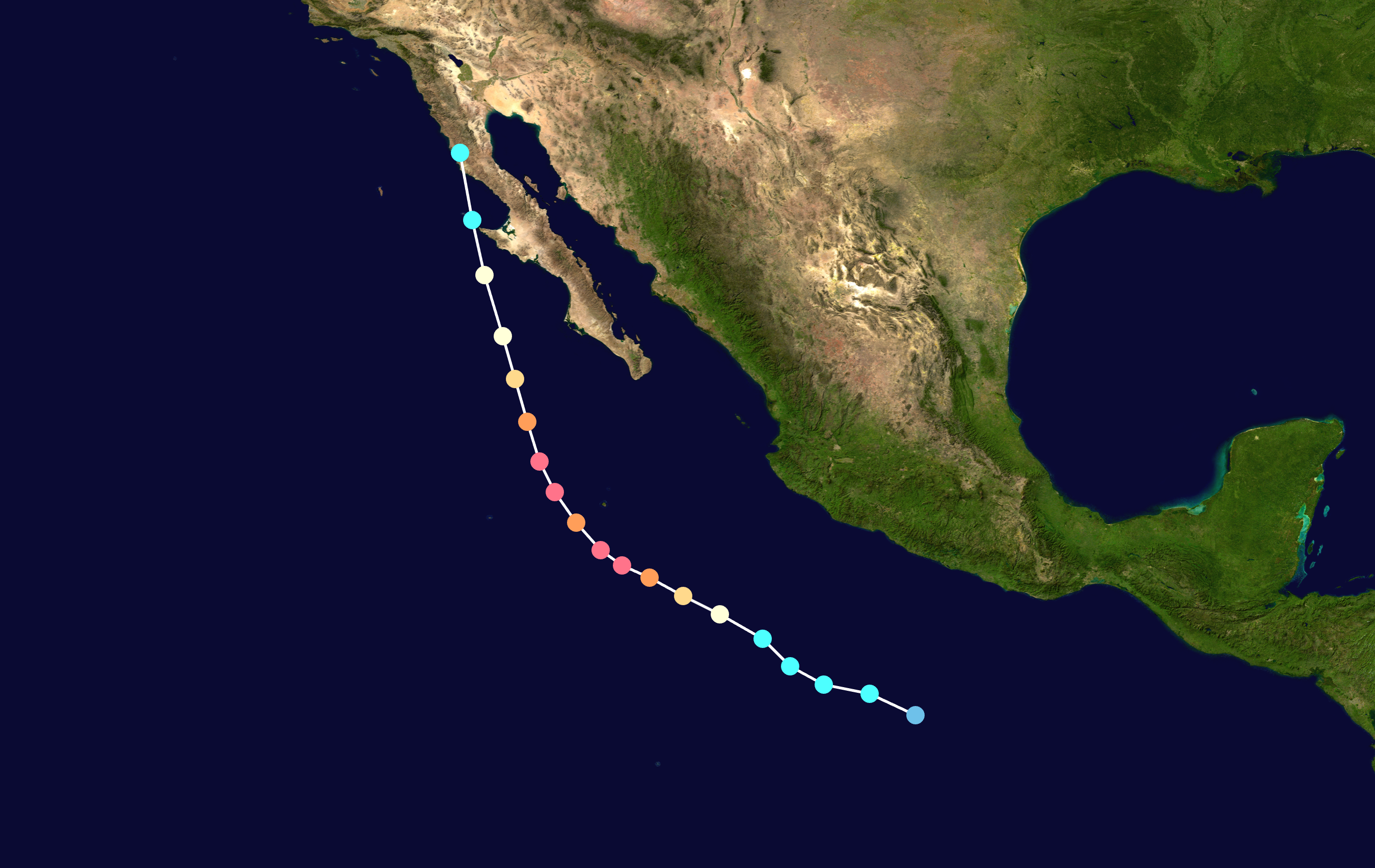
Map plotting the storm's track and intensity, according to the Saffir–Simpson scale Map key Saffir–Simpson scale Tropical depression (≤38 mph, ≤62 km/h) Tropical storm (39–73 mph, 63–118 km/h) Category 1 (74–95 mph, 119–153 km/h) Category 2 (96–110 mph, 154–177 km/h) Category 3 (111–129 mph, 178–208 km/h) Category 4 (130–156 mph, 209–251 km/h) Category 5 (≥157 mph, ≥252 km/h) Unknown Storm type Tropical cyclone Subtropical cyclone Extratropical cyclone, remnant low, tropical disturbance, or monsoon depression

The origins of Hurricane Hilary were from a tropical wave that exited the western coast of Africa around August 3. The wave moved westward across the Atlantic Ocean, reaching the Lesser Antilles by August 9. On that day, the National Hurricane Center (NHC) first identified the potential for the eventual development, 156 hours before Hilary's formation. The tropical wave crossed Central America into the far eastern Pacific Ocean on August 12, producing a large area of disorganized convection, or thunderstorms. As early as August 13, hurricane prediction models anticipated a tropical cyclone would affect Mexico and the southwestern United States. A low-pressure area developed on August 14 south of the Gulf of Tehuantepec, as the thunderstorms gradually organized. After a low-level circulation formed early on August 16, the system developed into a tropical depression by 06:00 UTC, located about 345 mi (555 km) south of Acapulco. Six hours later, the depression intensified into a tropical storm, and the NHC named it Hilary.

Upon its formation, Hilary was moving northwestward, steered by a ridge over Mexico. Atmospheric and environmental conditions were conducive for further strengthening, including warm sea surface temperatures of near 86 °F (30 °C), ample moisture, and low wind shear. Accordingly, the NHC warned that Hilary had a high likelihood of rapid intensification. Convection around the storm increased and organized into a central dense overcast, with an eye developing in the center. On August 17, Hilary intensified into a hurricane, by which time it had expanded into a large tropical cyclone, with tropical storm-force winds extending 230 mi (370 km) from the center. Symmetric outflow and pronounced rainbands developed around the hurricane. Early on August 18, Hilary intensified into a Category 3 hurricane on the Saffir-Simpson scale, thus becoming a major hurricane. The convection around the center organized into a thick ring around the eye. At 06:00 UTC that day, the NHC estimated that Hilary attained a peak intensity of 140 mph (220 km/h), making it a Category 4 hurricane, while its barometric pressure dropped to 940 mbar (28 inHg). Operationally, the NHC estimated slightly higher winds of 145 mph (230 km/h), and anticipated some slight further strengthening. The revised intensity estimate was based on satellite imagery using the Dvorak technique. By the time of its peak, Hilary had been rapidly intensifying for a continuous 48-hour period following its formation.

Hilary making landfall on the Baja California peninsula on August 20

After reaching its peak intensity, Hilary weakened slightly due to an eyewall replacement cycle, in which the inner eye collapsed as the larger, outer eyewall contracted. The Hurricane Hunters first investigated the storm late on August 18, by which time Hilary fell to Category 3 intensity. Around that time, the hurricane began moving more to the northwest, reaching the western periphery of the ridge over Mexico. Another Hurricane Hunters flight on August 19 observed that Hilary re-intensified into a Category 4 hurricane, with a secondary peak of 130 mph (215 km/h), and a pressure of 943 mbar (27.8 inHg). Thereafter, drier and stable air began affecting the hurricane, along with cooler water temperatures, causing the eye to fall apart. Hilary quickly weakened as it accelerated north-northwestward, responding to the steering influences of a trough of low pressure near the California coast and a ridge of high pressure over the central United States. The hurricane weakened into a tropical storm on August 20, as wind shear from the trough displaced the thunderstorms far north of the center. At around 17:00 UTC that day, Hilary made landfall in a sparsely populated part of the municipality of San Quintín, Baja California, with sustained winds estimated at 60 mph (95 km/h). This was about 215 mi (345 km) south-southeast of San Diego, California.

After moving ashore, Hilary's circulation became elongated and disrupted over the mountainous terrain of Baja California. Devoid of convection, Hilary degenerated into a post-tropical cyclone, and early on August 21, it was absorbed by a new non-tropical low-pressure area, which was developing near the southern coast of California outside of Hilary's wind radius. Operationally, the NHC had tracked the two systems as the same, assessing that Hilary continued into southern California as a tropical storm, which would have had made it the first tropical storm to cross into the state since Nora in 1997. The combined system, which included the remnants of Hilary, continued moving through the western United States and eventually crossed into Canada.

== Preparations ==
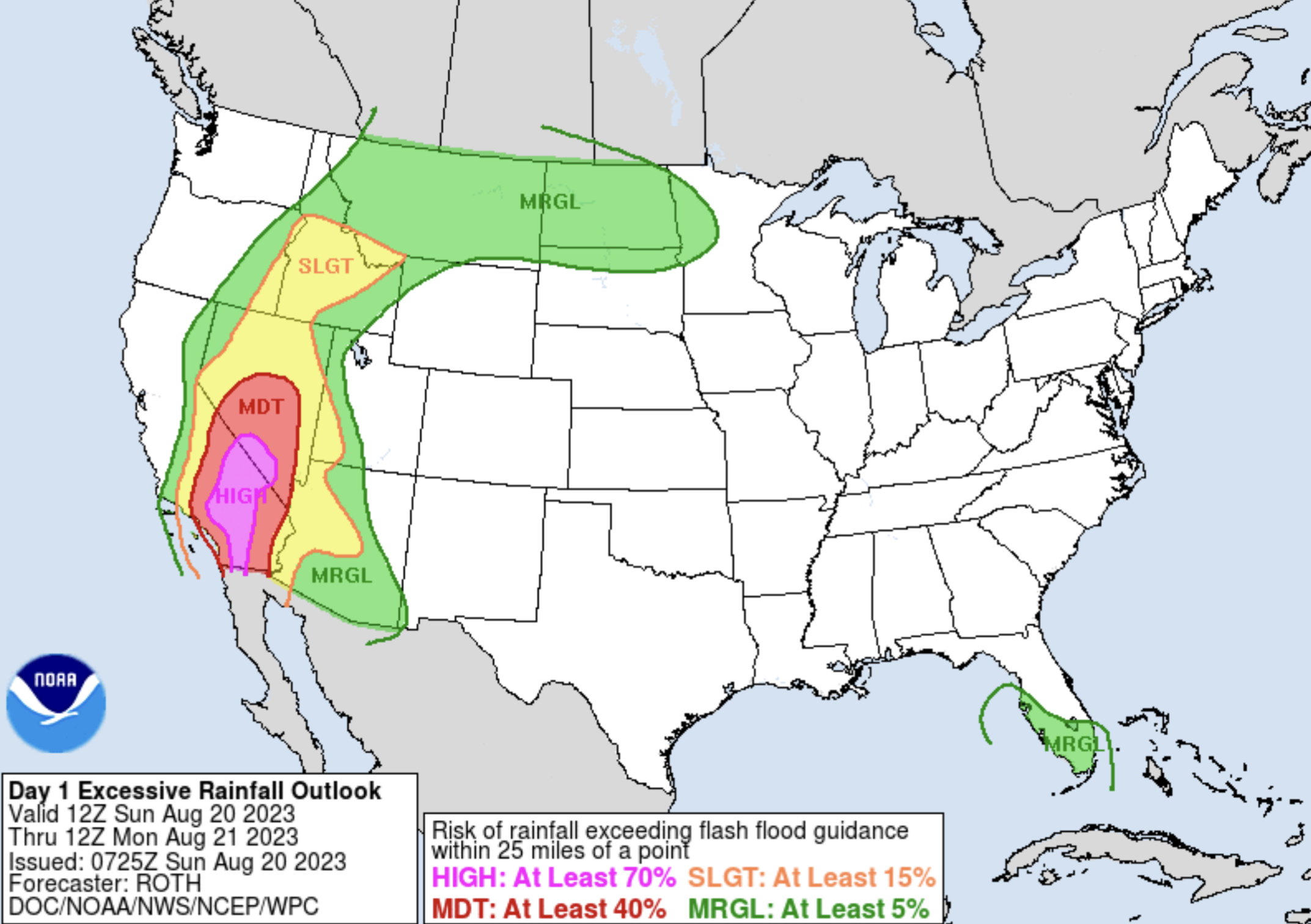
The Weather Prediction Center's Excessive Rainfall Outlook for August 20

=== Mexico ===
The Mexican government first issued tropical storm watches for southern Baja California Sur on August 17, upgrading them to warnings later that day. Hurricane watches were issued for western parts of the Baja California peninsula at 03:00 UTC on August 18, and by 15:00 UTC the same day, they were upgraded to hurricane warnings as hurricane watches were issued for the west coast of Baja California.

Nearly 1,900 people evacuated along the Baja California peninsula, utilizing at least 90 shelters. This included about 850 people evacuated by the Mexican Navy from five offshore islands. In Tijuana, at least 51 people rode out the storm in shelters. Officials in the city also moved homeless people to shelters. In Los Cabos at the southern tip of Baja California, dozens rode out the hurricane in storm shelters. Several schools in Cabo San Lucas were used as temporary shelters, and 18,000 soldiers were on alert. Officials closed ports from Oaxaca to Colima on August 17, and later extended closures to Baja California Sur. School classes and public activities were canceled in Baja California. Around 20 flights were canceled at Los Cabos International Airport. Beaches were closed in La Paz, Tijuana, and Ensenada.

=== United States ===
On August 15, five days before Hilary's landfall and a day before the system was named, local National Weather Service (NWS) offices in California first released videos and briefings related to the potential impacts. Two days later, the agency first issued a flood watch on August 17 for the mountain and desert regions of Southern California. On August 18, the NHC issued its first-ever tropical storm watch for Southern California, later upgraded to a tropical storm warning. The Weather Prediction Center (WPC) also issued a level 4/high risk for excessive rainfall, which was the first ever high risk of flash flooding in the desert valleys of Southern California east of the Peninsular Ranges. The NWS issued a flood watch for portions of California, Nevada, Utah, and Arizona, affecting about 26 million people. WPC forecaster David Roth described the rainfall potential as "exceedingly rare, bordering on unique, for the region from a tropical cyclone and unique for Nevada, which had its first ever High Risk WPC Day issued for the state". Roth expected a broad area would experience 1-in-100-year rainfall totals. The NWS also issued flash flood warnings for San Bernardino and Kern counties.

On August 20, the Storm Prediction Center issued a level 2/slight risk in Southern California, which included 5% risk of tornadoes. That night, a tornado warning was issued for Alpine and Descanso in San Diego County. The WPC later forecast the chance for 5 in (130 mm) of rainfall in the mountains of Idaho from the system. President Joe Biden urged people in the storm's path to take precautions. The Federal Emergency Management Agency (FEMA) prepared emergency supplies and coordinated with state agencies. Emergency operations centers were opened in San Diego and Los Angeles.

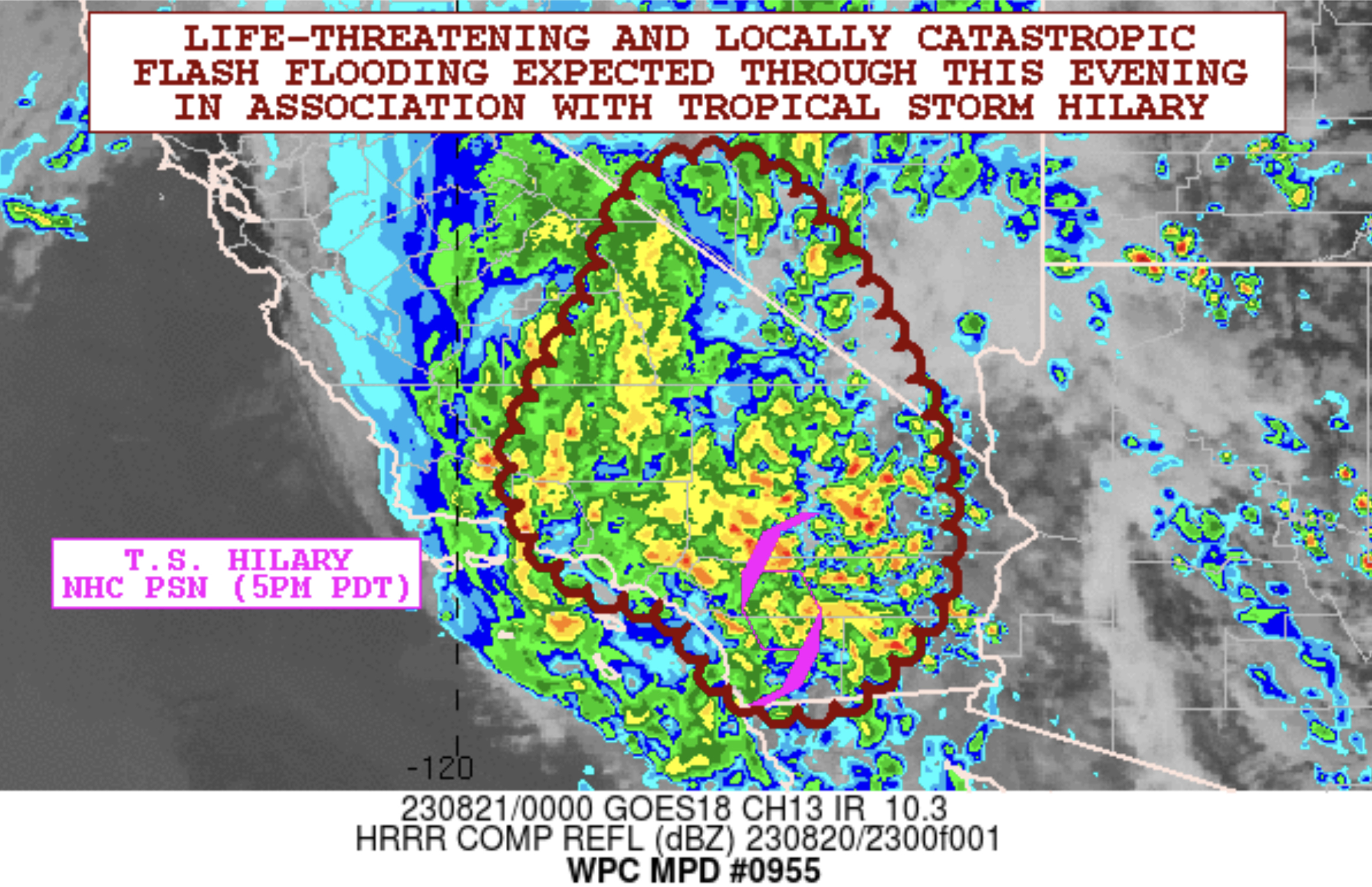
A mesoscale discussion from the Weather Prediction Center discussing flash flooding expected across most of Southern California as a result of the remnants of Hilary

California governor Gavin Newsom declared a state of emergency for southern California. Local states of emergency were declared in Los Angeles, Palm Springs, and Indio. The California National Guard preemptively deployed to multiple locations across southern California on August 19. The American Red Cross opened shelters in Imperial, San Bernardino, and Riverside counties. Emergency shelters were also opened by local governments in Yucca Valley and Twentynine Palms. Nevada governor Joe Lombardo deployed 100 National Guard and Nevada National Guard troops to assist southern Nevada impacted by severe weather associated with Hilary. Lombardo also declared a state of emergency, along with emergencies in Clark and Nye counties. The United States Navy evacuated about a dozen ships out to sea while also landing its aircraft in hangars in Coronado and El Centro. The Los Angeles County Department of Parks and Recreation announced that all parks and facilities would close for two days. The Los Angeles County Sheriff's Department advised all people to leave Catalina Island on August 19, while Avalon Bay was closed to boats and ships. Additional resources were deployed to the island by the Los Angeles County Sheriff's Department and the Los Angeles County Fire Department. On August 19, the San Bernardino County Sheriff's Department issued evacuation warnings for Oak Glen, Forest Falls, Mountain Home Village, Angelus Oaks and northeast Yucaipa. Officials issued a voluntary evacuation order for residents around the Salton Sea, due to the potential for flooding. Evacuation warnings were also issued for Orange County, including areas near the Bond Fire scar. Parts of Joshua Tree National Park, Death Valley National Park, Mojave National Preserve, and Lake Mead were closed. At Death Valley National Park, about 400 employees, residents, and visitors sheltered in place.

Amtrak canceled its August 19 run of the westbound Sunset Limited due to the storm; the eastbound August 20 run was also canceled with its Texas Eagle attachment originating in San Antonio. Amtrak also truncated the August 19 runs of westbound Southwest Chief and the southbound Coast Starlight to Albuquerque, New Mexico, and Emeryville, California, respectively. The August 20 runs of these two trains going eastbound and westbound respectively would also originate from these locations. Numerous Pacific Surfliner trains were also canceled. A Falcon 9 launch carrying Starlink satellites from Vandenberg Space Force Base in Santa Barbara County was postponed by SpaceX. Numerous airlines offered travel waivers to airports in Southern California, after at least 1,000 flights were canceled and 3,700 were delayed across the region. Affected airports included Palm Springs, Los Angeles, Bakersfield, Burbank, Long Beach, Ontario, Orange County, Santa Barbara, San Luis Obispo, and San Diego.

Major League Baseball rescheduled three games in advance of Hilary: one each for the San Diego Padres, Los Angeles Dodgers, and Los Angeles Angels. Major League Soccer home games for the LA Galaxy and Los Angeles FC were also rescheduled. Del Mar Racetrack canceled the race meeting scheduled on August 20. This was only the second time in the track's 84-year history that such a cancellation occurred. In addition, no live audience was permitted to attend the August 20 games for VALORANT Champions Los Angeles at the Shrine Auditorium and Expo Hall. Ongoing strikes by the Writers Guild of America and SAG-AFTRA were canceled for Monday in Los Angeles in preparation for Hilary. A concert at the Hollywood Bowl was postponed, and all Los Angeles County Department of Parks and Recreation areas were closed. Disneyland and Disney California Adventure were closed early. Legoland California, SeaWorld San Diego and San Diego Zoo were closed on August 20. The Los Angeles Zoo, Six Flags Magic Mountain, and Knott's Berry Farm were also closed. California State University, Los Angeles and California State University, Fullerton canceled classes on August 21. All campuses in the Bear Valley Unified School District were closed on August 21. On August 20, the Los Angeles Unified School District announced that campuses would be closed the following day. Several schools in Orange County were closed. Fullerton College was closed as well, and schools across the Anaheim Union High School District, Anaheim Elementary School District, and South Orange County Community College District were also closed. DoorDash temporarily suspended operations in numerous areas across southern California.

== Impact ==
=== Mexico ===
Costliest Pacific hurricanes
Rank	Cyclone	Season	Damage	Ref
1	5 Otis	2023	$12–16 billion	
2	1 Manuel	2013	$4.2 billion	
3	4 Iniki	1992	$3.1 billion	
4	3 John	2024	$2.45 billion	
5	4 Odile	2014	$1.82 billion	
6	TS Agatha	2010	$1.1 billion	
7	4 Hilary	2023	$948 million	
8	5 Willa	2018	$825 million	
9	1 Madeline	1998	$750 million	
10	2 Rosa	1994	$700 million	

Hurricane Hilary caused four fatalities in Mexico during its passage, all related to people in vehicles. One occurred in Santa Rosalía in Baja California Sur, when floodwaters breached a protection wall, sweeping away a vehicle, with four of the occupants rescued. There was a traffic accident in Tijuana that led to a death and an injury. In Cataviña, Baja California, a driver was swept away by a stream and was killed. The last fatality occurred in Navolato in Sinaloa. From its genesis to its dissipation, Hilary's outer rainbands affected much of western Mexico as far southeast as Oaxaca. Offshore western Mexico, Hurricane Hilary passed west of Socorro Island near the time of its peak intensity, producing wind gusts of 79 mph (127 km/h). Along the Baja California peninsula, Hilary produced heavy rainfall and gusty winds. The heaviest rainfall was 12.83 in (326 mm), recorded in San Lucas Norte in northeastern Baja California Sur, which was 180% of the average annual rainfall for the state. High rains caused flooding and landslides across the peninsula. Rainfall spread across the peninsula and into the adjacent states of Sonora and Sinaloa. The highest wind gust in Mexico was recorded by a high-altitude anemometer in Sierra de la Laguna, Baja California Sur, which recorded wind gusts of 99 mph (159 km/h) at an elevation of 6,395 ft (1,949 m). Closer to sea level, wind gusts reached 69 mph (111 km/h) at Loreto International Airport along the peninsula's eastern coast. Tropical storm-force winds extended into the state of Sonora, where Mar de Cortés International Airport in Puerto Peñasco recorded gusts of 66 mph (106 km/h).

Across northwestern Mexico, the storm left 315,929 people without electricity. At least 87 homes were damaged in Baja California Sur, with the worst damage in Loreto, Mulegé, and Comondú. Damage in the state amounted to Mex$427 million (US$24 million). In Santa Rosalía alone, the storm destroyed 26 houses, while in Comondú, another 15 buildings were wrecked. In Mulegé municipality, soldiers assisted families in evacuations after a stream flooded houses. Torrential rainfall caused widespread flooding and landslides in Baja California Sur. In Los Cabos at the southern end of the peninsula, the hurricane caused minor damage to utilities and roads, including potholes. Hilary damaged 40 elementary schools, although not to a significant enough degree to disrupt the start of the school year. Officials in Baja California reported numerous mud and rock slides across the state. In the state of Baja California, floods damaged the Transpeninsular Highway and a dozen other major roads. Coastal areas of Sinaloa recorded torrential rains from the hurricane's passage. In Sinaloa, the storm knocked down 33 power poles, affecting rural roads.

=== United States ===
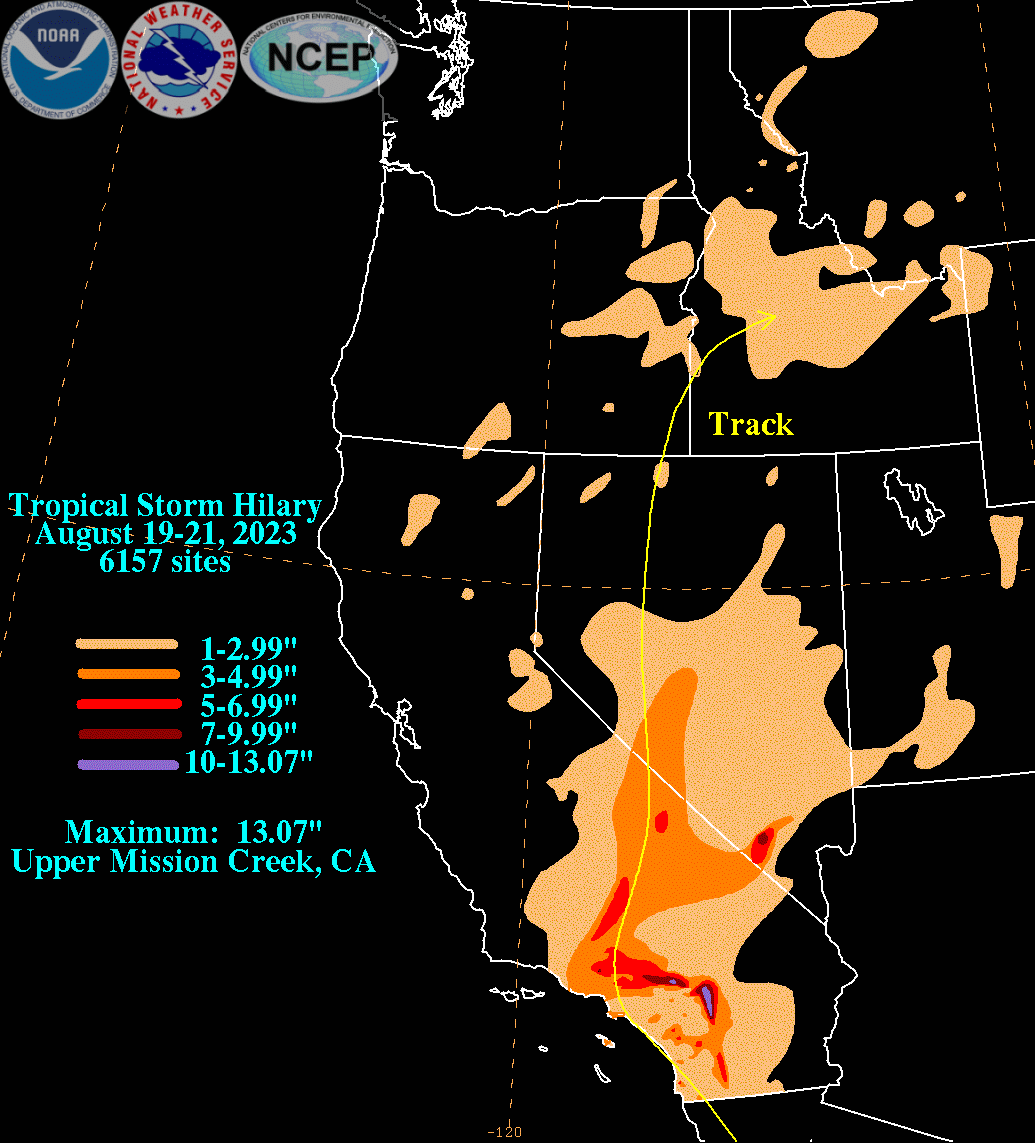
Map of rainfall from Hurricane Hilary in the United States

The remnants of Hilary moved through the western United States, producing rainfall from California to as far north as Montana. The maximum recorded precipitation was 13.07 in (332 mm) at Upper Mission Creek in southeastern California. Damage nationwide was estimated at US$900 million. The system's push toward Southern California coincided with a 5.1 magnitude earthquake that struck near Ojai, California, along with numerous aftershocks. Only minor damage and no injuries were reported from the quakes. As a result, the term "hurriquake" trended on social media. Because Hilary was already weakened by the time of the earthquake, researchers considered it unlikely that the storm triggered the event.

==== California ====
While Hilary approached and dissipated near Southern California, the storm produced locally high winds along with heavy rainfall. Some desert locations received more than half of their annual rainfall in a single day, or six times their usual August precipitation. The strongest wind gusts were recorded in Los Angeles County – 87 mph (140 km/h) at Magic Mountain. Another hurricane-force wind gust occurred in San Diego County – 84 mph (135 km/h) at Big Black Mountain. High winds knocked down at least 50 power poles in the town of Thermal. The highest rain totals were recorded in the San Bernardino Mountains – 11.73 in (298 mm) at Raywood Flats, and the San Jacinto Mountains – 11.74 in (298 mm) at Mount San Jacinto. Floodwaters in the community of Angelus Oaks swept away a mobile home, killing a woman. The remnants of Hilary set rainfall records across the state. Rainfall at Furnace Creek in Death Valley totaled 2.20 in (56 mm), setting a new single-day rainfall record; the amount was more than the annual average rainfall of 2.15 in (55 mm). On August 20, downtown Los Angeles and San Diego each recorded its wettest single summer day on record (June through August) with 2.48 in (63 mm) and 1.82 in (46 mm) of precipitation, respectively. Palm Springs recorded 3.18 in (81 mm), also a single summer day record amount, or 69% of its average annual rainfall. Along the coast, Hilary caused beach erosion. The storm's rains caused a temporary break during the 2023 California wildfires.

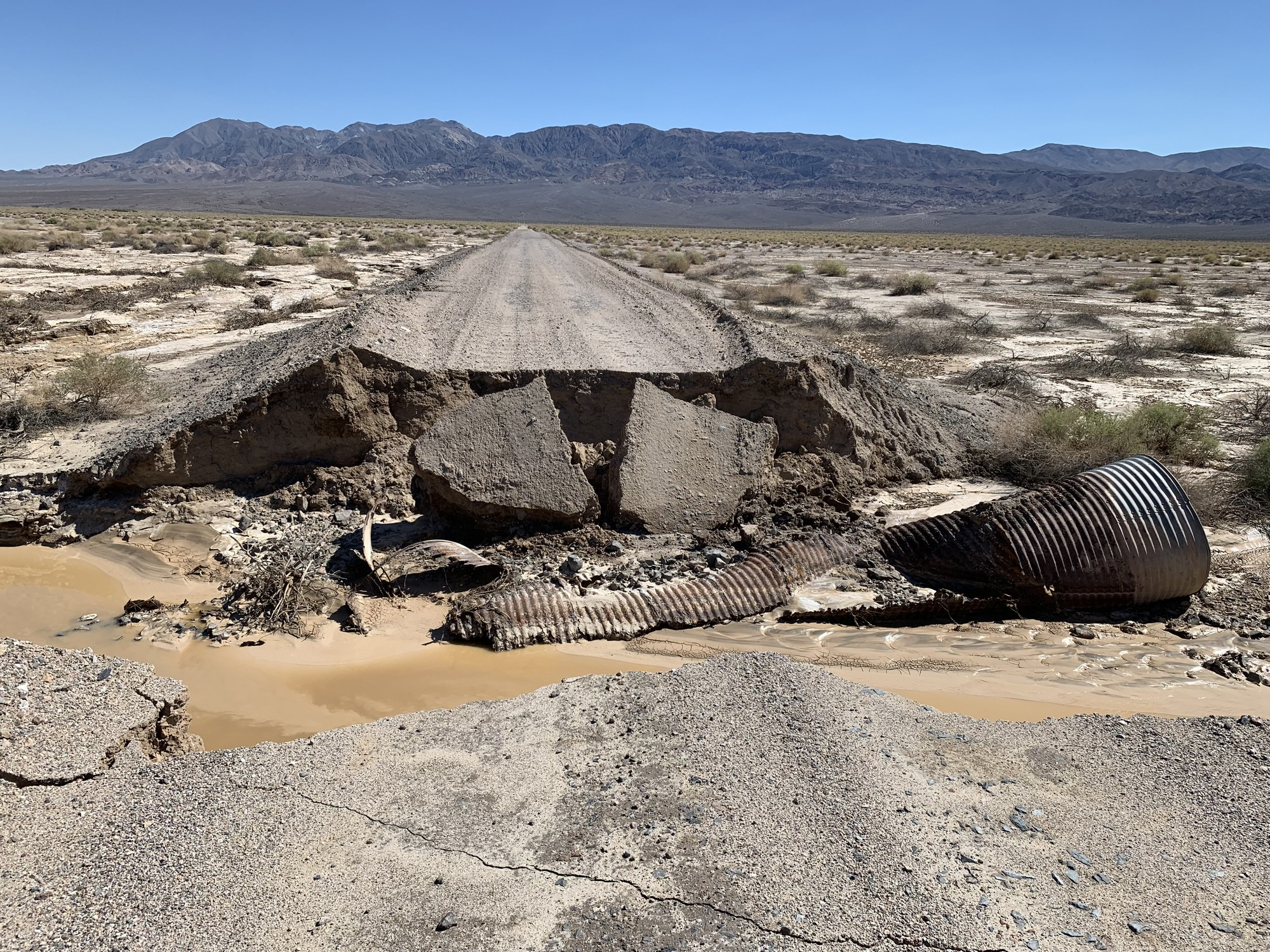
Road damage in Death Valley National Park

The collective impacts of downed trees and floods damaged or washed away roads in 13 counties across California, from San Diego and Imperial counties along the state's southern border with Mexico to Siskiyou County in far northern California. The California Department of Transportation (CALTRANS) estimated the cost to repair roads at over $146 million. Portions of interstates 5, 8, 10, and 15 were closed, along with the Pacific Coast Highway and other roads. A nearly 30 mi (48 km) stretch of I-10 closed for two days from the floods, mud, and debris, which stranded hundreds of vehicles, and made it difficult to travel to Palm Springs. In Imperial County near Ocotillo, I-8 was closed for two days after three large boulders fell onto the eastbound highway. On the same interstate, the high winds blew over two tractor-trailers. Closed state roads included portions of routes 14, 38, 58, 127, 136, 178, and 190. In Death Valley National Park, flash floods damaged all of the 1,323 mi (2,129 km) of roads, including water and sewage lines, with several miles of roads washed away entirely. The resulting damage forced the park to close for two months. Near Lone Pine, floodwaters from Lone Pine Creek destroyed portions of Whitney Portal Road, which provides access to Mount Whitney. Damage in Inyo County alone was estimated at $500 million. Flash floods also damaged roads and trails in Mojave National Preserve. Farther north, heavy rain produced mudslides and flash flooding in Siskiyou County near Mount Shasta, damaging roads and drains.

Damage in Riverside County totaled $126 million, including about $83 million in damaged roads and bridges, and about $26 million affecting water systems. That made it the costliest natural disaster in the history of the county, with much of it occurring in the Coachella Valley. Across the valley, 911 emergency phone service was down for a few days, which required residents to either text or call alternate numbers for emergencies. At least six state highways in Riverside County were closed due to floods, debris flow, or rockslides. Floods washed out a bridge over the Mias Canyon, isolating residents in Oak Glen. In Seven Oaks, around 30 people required rescue after the Santa Ana River overflowed, with several homes and vehicles destroyed. Along the Whitewater River, floodwaters 15 ft (4.6 m) deep damaged a bridge, derailed eight train cars, and buried another train in mud. In Palm Desert, floodwaters displaced at least 30 residents in the Spanish Walk neighborhood. Also in Palm Desert, high winds knocked down a large tree, blocking a portion of SR 111. In Cathedral City, floodwaters entered a nursing home, requiring 14 people to be rescued by loaders. At least 10 people in Thermal evacuated to shelters. Floodwaters entered Eisenhower Medical Center in Rancho Mirage, but this did not impact operations there. In Palm Springs, the floods inundated vehicles, while downed power lines sparked a few small fires.

In San Diego, the heavy rainfall caused the San Diego River to quickly rise to a crest of 9.8 ft (3.0 m). City firefighters rescued a group of 13 people from a flooded homeless camp along the river, while the Harbor Police rescued two people from a boat washed against Harbor Island. Floodwaters washed out a portion of SR 78 at Yaqui Pass. High winds overturned a semi-trailer truck near Borrego Springs. Near Twentynine Palms, high winds blew the roof of a building. In La Habra in Orange County, the winds damaged housing shingles. About 41,000 customers were left without electricity across the Los Angeles area. Also in the city, a mudslide damaged the Marlton School. Across the Imperial Valley, high winds downed trees and power poles, as well as damaging a gas station canopy in El Centro. Damage in Imperial County reached $9.3 million. In Barstow, a lightning strike knocked down a power pole onto I-15, closing the highway. The storm spawned a microburst in Fresno, producing winds of 55 mph (89 km/h), which knocked down 50 trees at the Belmont Country Club. Winds also knocked down a power pole and electric lines in the city.

==== Elsewhere ====
New U.S. wettest tropical cyclones and their remnants records (Note: For the 72-hour period between 7:00 a.m. PDT August 18, through 7:00 a.m. PDT August 21.)
State	Precipitation	Location
Idaho	3.00 in (76 mm)	Dollarhide Summit
Montana	2.30 in (58 mm)	Albro Lake
Montana	2.30 in (58 mm)	Carrot Basin
Nevada	9.20 in (234 mm)	Lee Canyon
Oregon	3.29 in (84 mm)	Morgan Mountain

Locally heavy rainfall spread across much of the western United States from the remnants of Hilary. Arizona received much less precipitation from Hilary than forecasted, only peaking at 2.10 in (53 mm) in Hilltop. However, records for wettest (total rainfall) tropical cyclones and their remnants were broken in four states: Idaho, Montana, Nevada, and Oregon. The strongest winds beyond California primarily occurred in Nevada and Utah at high-elevation locations above 9,000 ft (2,700 m). In a mountainous area near Mount Charleston, in Clark County, Nevada, wind gusts reached 82 mph (132 km/h), strong enough to knock down a few trees. The weather station at Cardiff Pass in Utah recorded a gust of 75 mph (121 km/h). Thunderstorms produced high winds near Weiser, Idaho, reaching 69 mph (111 km/h), which also knocked down trees.

The new peak rainfall in Nevada was more than double the previous record, with 9.20 in (234 mm) recorded in Lee Canyon. Across Spring Mountains National Recreation Area and nearby mountainous areas, the rains produced flash flooding, which washed away about 5 mi (8.0 km) worth of roads. The floods also damaged underground pipes, a school, a fire station, and trails. The damage, estimated at $35 million, closed the recreation area until October 26, when Nevada State Route 156 (Lee Canyon Road) was reopened. The community of Mount Charleston had to shelter in place after electricity and road access were cut off. The town's fire department was inundated with mud, with houses and a nearby school damaged. A landslide also damaged part of Lee Canyon Ski and Snowboard Resort. Floods closed a portion of U.S. Route 95 in Nye County, Nevada. The rains rose the water levels in Lake Mead by 4.1 mm (0.16 in). In eastern Washington, rain from the system was beneficial with helping extinguish the active wildfires. In Jackson Hole, Wyoming, the storm brought rain and an uptick in humidity levels on August 21.

== Aftermath ==
On August 28, 2023, the government of Mexico declared a state of emergency for two municipalities in Baja California – San Quintín and Ensenada – as well as two municipalities in Baja California Sur – Mulegé and Comondú. The state of Baja California Sur utilized emergency funds to mobilize resources toward restoring the damage from Hilary. The Federal Electricity Commission deployed thousands of electricians to restore the damaged power network within four days. Within a day of Hilary's passage, travel resumed along the Transpeninsular Highway, after workers repaired potholes caused by the storm. State officials identified 52 families in high-risk areas to be relocated. By September 5, there were no people remaining in the emergency shelters, as displaced families relocated to hotels.

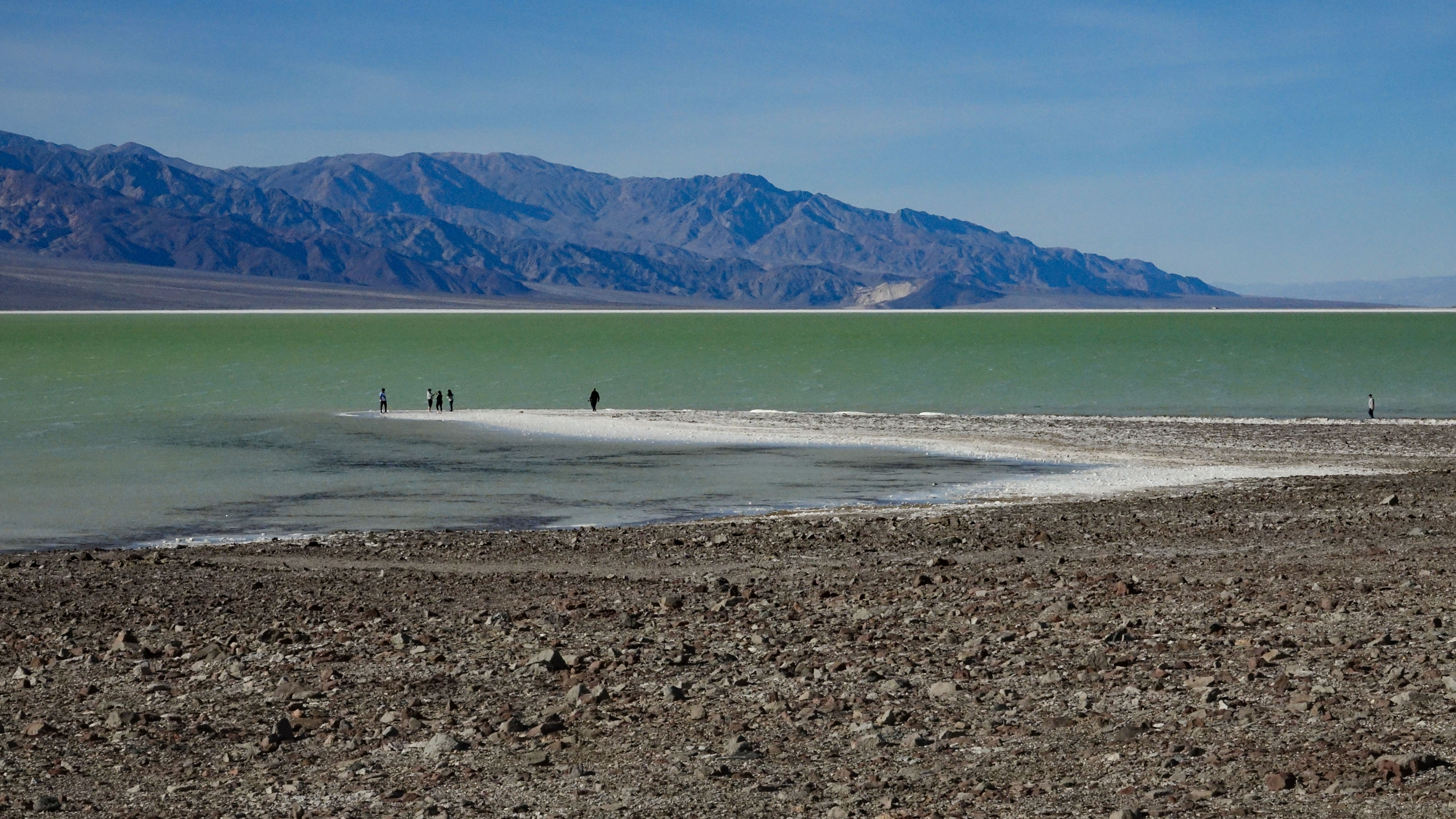
Lake Manly in Badwater Basin, Death Valley, in December 2023

In Death Valley National Park, workers began clearing and assessing the damaged roads and infrastructure after the rains ended. Late on August 21, crews reopened SR 190 to allow an exit for those who stayed in the park during the floods; however, the road was not opened fully until October 15, marking the longest ever closure in the park's history. The Federal Highway Administration's Emergency Relief for Federally Owned Roads program funded the road repairs, which continued over the following months. On November 1, the park's entrance in Beatty, Nevada re-opened with emergency repairs. Following heavy rainfall in Death Valley, floodwaters reformed the ancient Lake Manly in the usually dry Badwater Basin, lasting several months. The road to Badwater Basin reopened on November 20, allowing access to the temporary lake. Following additional rainfall from an atmospheric river in February 2024, the park allowed visitors to kayak on the temporary lake, which grew to a length of 6 mi (9.7 km), a width of 3 mi (4.8 km), and a depth of 0.30 m (1 ft). By April 2024, the emergency phase in the park had ended after all of the roads were reopened.

Due to the damage in California, Riverside County announced in September 2023 the availability of tax relief for property owners incurring more than $10,000 in damage, while also opening an office in Yucaipa to provide assistance to the public. On October 3, the United States Small Business Administration opened a Disaster Loan Outreach Center in Angelus Oaks, to provide loans to homes and businesses affected by the storm. On October 5, the U.S. Department of Transportation's Federal Highway Administration announced the release of $15.3 million in emergency funds to help rebuild roads and bridges in 12 California counties. On November 22, President Biden announced a major disaster declaration for five California counties affected by the storm: Imperial, Inyo, Kern, Riverside and Siskiyou. The announcement provided federal funding for emergency work toward repairing or replacing damaged public facilities. On December 14, the Palm Desert city council authorized a $4.63 million contract to expand a water retention basin by about 36%, near where I-10 was flooded. The project was intended to withstand the 100-year flood. In the Mount Charleston region of Nevada, workers spent $11 million to reopen roads to the mountainous communities. At the Lee Canyon Ski Resort, workers used dump trucks to restore damaged ski slopes, reopening the resort on November 4.

== See also ==
- Weather of 2023
- Tropical cyclones in 2023
- List of Category 4 Pacific hurricanes
- List of Baja California hurricanes
- List of California hurricanes
- List of wettest tropical cyclones in the United States
- Timeline of the 2023 Pacific hurricane season
- 1858 San Diego hurricane – Passed near San Diego as a hurricane
- 1939 California tropical storm – Only tropical cyclone on record to make landfall in California
- Hurricane Kathleen (1976) – Category 1 hurricane, followed a similar track to Hilary
- Hurricane Doreen (1977) – Took a path similar to Hilary's
- Hurricane Nora (1997) – Category 4 hurricane, also followed a similar track to Hilary.
- Hurricane Dolores (2015) – Also affected Southern California as a remnant low.
- Hurricane Rachel (2026) – The only other tropical cyclone on record to trigger tropical storm watches in California.
