= List of California hurricanes =

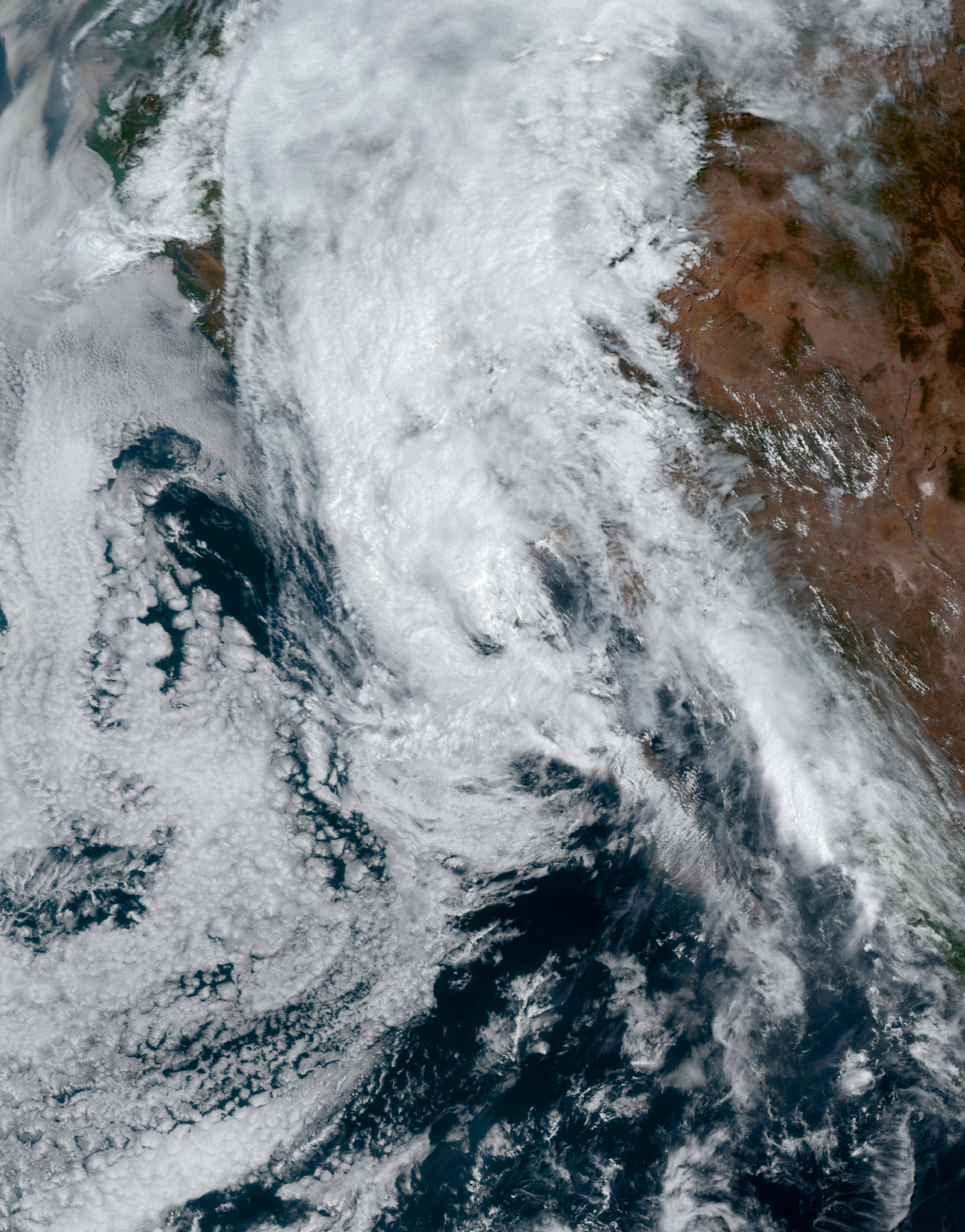
Satellite image of dissipating Hurricane Hilary in August 2023, which caused damaging floods across the state

Since 1854, at least 114 tropical storms affected the U.S. state of California, including a hurricane in 1858 that produced hurricane-force winds near San Diego. This averages to roughly once a year, although events are more likely during El Niño events. Although storms have occurred as early as June and as late as November, they are most likely during the month of September. Due to cold sea surface temperatures and the typical track of most Pacific hurricanes, there has only been one recorded landfall of a tropical storm in the state – a storm in 1939 that hit Los Angeles, killing 45 people after catching many residents off guard. There have been at least 18 other deadly tropical cyclones affecting California.

Typically, the greatest threat to California from tropical cyclones is rainfall, which can cause flash flooding when the precipitation accumulates quickly enough. Former Hurricane Kathleen in 1976 produced 14.76 inches (375 mm) of rainfall along Mount San Gorgonio, which was the highest precipitation in the state related to an Atlantic or Pacific hurricane. Kathleen killed 11 people in the state from heavy rainfall, with severe flooding affecting the city of Ocotillo. On some occasions, tropical cyclones have dropped the equivalent to a year's worth of rainfall, particularly in the deserts of southern California.

California occasionally experiences high surf and rip currents from distant but powerful hurricanes, such as Hurricane Guillermo in 1997, which killed a swimmer in Orange County. Although the state does not usually suffer from high winds, there have been eight tropical cyclones that have brought gale-force winds to California since 1850, including the hurricane of 1858 and the 1939 tropical storm. Those include the remnants of Tropical Storm Jennifer-Katherine in 1963, Hurricane Emily in 1965, and Hurricane Joanne in 1972. Tropical Storm Nora in 1997 entered the state, producing gale-force winds and heavy rainfall that led to four traffic deaths. The remnants of Hurricane Kay in 2022 produced flooding and 109 mph (175 km/h) wind gusts across southern California, killing one person. In August 2023, the remnants of Hurricane Hilary produced 87 mph (140 km/h) winds along with heavy rainfall, with floods killing one person. Most recently, floods triggered by Tropical Storm Mario in 2025 killed one person. In September 2026, swells from Hurricane Marie produced surf of up to 10 ft (3.0 m) that breached a seawall in Long Beach and forced the evacuation of oceanfront homes in Long Beach, Malibu, and Dana Point, without any reported deaths. In October 2026, the remnants of Hurricane Rachel prompted a tropical storm watch for San Diego County, only the second ever issued for California, and brought heavy rain and damaging surf to Southern California.

== Climatology and warnings ==
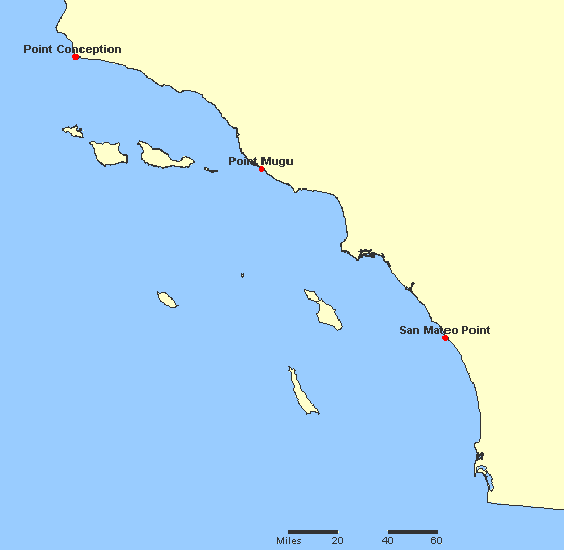
Map of warning breakpoints

The state of California rarely experiences Pacific hurricanes for various reasons. Typically, storms in the region move to the west or northwest, away from the North American mainland and out to sea. In addition, much of the coast of California experiences cold sea surface temperatures due to the California Current. As a result, the temperatures in the summer rarely rise above 24 °C (75 °F) in southern California, too cold to sustain intense tropical cyclones, and much cooler than the same latitude along the United States Atlantic coastline. Consequently, the primary threat from tropical cyclones in the region is not from winds, but from rainfall and flash floods. Occasionally, these storms enter southern California after making landfall along Mexico's Baja California peninsula, or otherwise in their dissipating stage. In other instances, a mid-latitude trough can draw moisture from a distant tropical cyclone. Northern California is rarely affected by tropical cyclones.

Roughly once a year, tropical cyclones affect the southwestern United States. The frequency of events increases during El Niño or La Nina events, such as 1932, 1939, 1963, 1965, 1972, 1976, 1977, 1982, 1997, 2014, 2015, 2022, 2023, 2025, and 2026. A record four tropical cyclones affected the state in September 1939, which set monthly precipitation records across the region. Included among the four was the most recent tropical storm to make landfall in the state. Although tropical cyclones have affected the state between June and October, September is the month with the most events, which is when storms can be drawn northward by strong upper-level troughs.

Until around 1920, the United States Weather Bureau did not acknowledge the eastern Pacific Ocean as a tropical cyclone basin. After the unexpected 1939 Long Beach tropical storm, the weather bureau set up a forecast office for southern California in February 1940. Before 1965, the lack of satellite imagery meant that some tropical cyclones that affected the region were undetected. In the event a tropical cyclone threatens the state, the National Hurricane Center (NHC) issues a variety of advisories and bulletins, including tropical cyclone warnings and watches. The NHC can issue these advisories at one of seven locations along the Pacific coast, known as breakpoints, beginning at the Mexico–United States border, and continuing northward to Point Piedras Blancas. The first ever tropical storm watch or warning for the state was in 2023 during Hurricane Hilary.

== List of tropical cyclones ==
Hurricanes that affect California are mainly the remnants of hurricanes or tropical storms. In the twentieth century, only four eastern Pacific tropical cyclones have brought tropical storm-force winds to the Continental United States: the 1939 Long Beach Tropical Storm, Tropical Storm Joanne in 1972, Tropical Storm Kathleen in 1976, and Tropical Storm Nora in 1997.

=== Pre–1900 ===
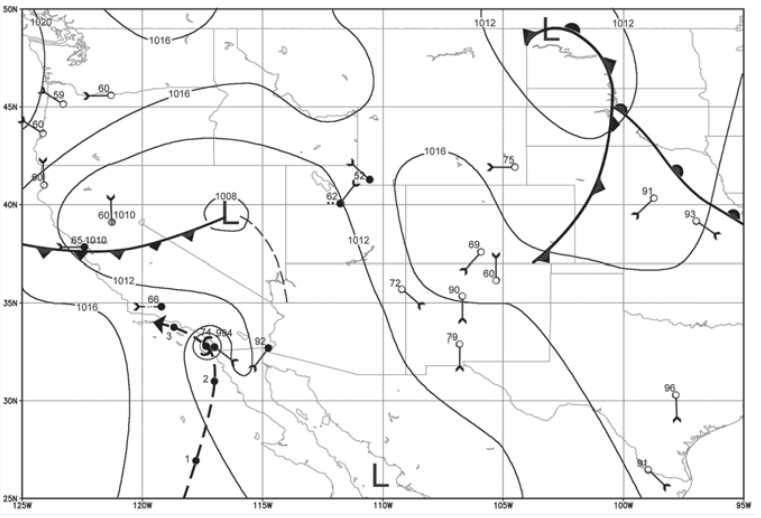
Surface weather analysis for the 1858 San Diego hurricane

- After October 1854 – A system considered to be a tropical cyclone made landfall over Northern California, just north of the Golden Gate.
- October 2, 1858 – A hurricane near San Diego washed ships ashore and lashed the southern California coast with gale-force winds from San Diego to Long Beach. In 2012, meteorologists Michael Chenoweth and Christopher Landsea assessed it as the only tropical cyclone on record to have produced hurricane-force winds in a small coastal area of southern California, although the storm was assessed as remaining offshore.
- Sometime before October 14, 1858 – Since this tropical cyclone is reported in a newspaper as being only "one of the most terrific and violent hurricanes ever noted", the report may imply the existence of an earlier hurricane in southern California. Other than occurring before the newspaper account was published (October 18, 1858), everything else about this "hurricane", including whether it even existed, is unknown.
- Before June or after October 1859 – A system considered to be a tropical cyclone made landfall between Cape Mendocino and San Francisco Bay.
- August 11–12, 1873 – Rain from a tropical storm fell on San Diego. The rain on August 12 set a record for wettest August day.

=== 1900–1909 ===
- July 20–21, 1902 – A tropical cyclone struck the southern Baja California peninsula and dissipated, although the monsoon drew its moisture northward. San Diego recorded 0.83 in (21 mm), which was the highest July rainfall total for the city until 2015 when it was surpassed by Hurricane Dolores.
- August 18–19, 1906 – A tropical cyclone traversed much of the Gulf of California before dissipating, spreading rainfall across southern California. Needles recorded 3.74 in (95 mm) from the storm, which was roughly 91% of its average annual precipitation.

=== 1910s ===
- September 15, 1910 – A tropical cyclone dissipated southwest of Los Angeles, dropping rainfall across most of the state, especially along the coast. Ozena recorded 4.50 in (114 mm) of precipitation.
- August 26, 1915 – A tropical cyclone dissipated west of the Baja California peninsula, spreading rainfall across southern California. In a 90-minute period, Riverside recorded 1.01 in (26 mm) of precipitation, which is about 10 times of the city's average August rainfall.
- September 11–12, 1918 – A trough interacted with a dissipating hurricane to produce heavy rainfall across northern California. Red Bluff recorded 7.14 in (181 mm), more than 20 times the average September rainfall. San Jose and Livermore recorded their largest daily rainfalls on September 12.

=== 1920s ===
- September 10–13, 1920 – The remnants of a tropical cyclone moved into southeastern California, bringing light rainfall.
- August 20–21, 1921 – A tropical cyclone crossed Baja California into the Gulf of California, spreading rainfall across southern California. Calexico recorded 2.84 in (72 mm) of precipitation, more than its average annual rainfall.
- September 30, 1921 – A tropical cyclone struck northern Baja California and moved northeastward into the southwestern United States, bringing heavy rainfall. Blythe recorded 3.11 in (79 mm) over two days, more than its annual rainfall.
- September 18, 1929 – A hurricane dissipated west of the Baja California peninsula, although it spread moisture across southern California. Cuyamaca recorded 3.21 in (82 mm).

=== 1930s ===
- September 28–October 1, 1932 –A hurricane traversed most of the Gulf of California, spreading rainfall across California over four days. Tehachapi recorded 7.11 in (181 mm) of rainfall, of which more than half was recorded over a seven-hour period. The rains produced flash flooding that killed 15 people. Trains were derailed and buildings were washed away, with damages estimated at over $1 million.
- August 25, 1935 – A dissipating tropical cyclone moved ashore Point Conception in Santa Barbara County as a remnant low. The storm produced scattered thunderstorms across southern California. Riverside recorded 2.01 in (51 mm) of rainfall.
- August 9, 1936 – A hurricane tracked up the majority of the Gulf of California before dissipating, although it spread rainfall across southern California.
- September 4–7, 1939 – A hurricane struck the northern Baja California peninsula and interacted with a shortwave trough, bringing rainfall across southern California. The highest total was 6.33 in (161 mm) at Brawley, which was more than twice the average annual rainfall. There was heavy damage in the Coachella Valley in Mecca.
- September 11–12, 1939 – A tropical storm struck the western Baja California peninsula only six days after the previous storm. It dropped 4 in (100 mm) across the deserts of southern California.
- September 19–21, 1939 – Another tropical storm struck the western Baja California peninsula, with a peak rainfall of 2.90 in (74 mm) recorded in San Jacinto.
- September 25, 1939 – A tropical storm known as El Cordonazo, or The Lash of St. Francis, made landfall near Long Beach with sustained winds of 50 mph (85 km/h), which as of 2026 is the most recent tropical storm landfall in California. The storm killed 45 people across southern California, and another 48 people at sea, with residents caught unprepared. Rains related to the storm reached 11.60 in (295 mm) at Mount Wilson. Floodwaters 2 ft (0.61 m) deep inundated the eastern Coachella Valley. Damage reached $2 million.

=== 1940s ===
- September 8–12, 1941 – A hurricane struck Cabo San Lucas, but its remnants dropped light rainfall in southern California, reaching about 0.5 in (13 mm).
- August 18, 1945 – The remnants of a hurricane produced thunderstorms in southern California, producing floodwaters 18 in (460 mm) deep in Mecca.
- September 9–10, 1945 – A tropical cyclone dissipated offshore northern Baja California, bringing about 2 in (51 mm) to the mountains of southern California.
- September 29–October 1, 1946 – A tropical storm moved ashore the northern Baja California peninsula, spreading heavy rainfall into the mountains of southern California. A cloudburst in San Bernardino dropped 3 in (76 mm) of rainfall in a 30-minute period, resulting in floods that damaged roads and orchards.

=== 1950s ===
- August 27–29, 1951 – A tropical storm struck northern Baja California and produced a plume of rainfall across southern California, reaching 5.11 in (130 mm) in Blythe. Floods washed out several roads in the Imperial Valley.
- September 19–21, 1952 – A hurricane offshore the Baja California peninsula generated thunderstorms across the southwestern United States, reaching 2.11 in (54 mm) in the San Jacinto Mountains.
- July 16–19, 1954 – A hurricane struck the western Baja California peninsula, spreading rainfall into southern California that reached 2 in (51 mm). Floods covered a nearly 8 mi (13 km) portion of U.S. 66.
- July 28–30, 1958 – A tropical storm dissipated west of the Baja California peninsula, spreading moisture and rainfall into southern California, reaching 2 in (51 mm) at Barton Flats. Floods and mudslides covered five cars, inundated a portion of U.S. 66, and entered a few buildings.
- September 11, 1959 – A hurricane tracked up the Baja California peninsula, spreading scattered showers across California.

=== 1960s ===
- September 9–10, 1960 – Moisture from dissipating Hurricane Estelle generated heavy rainfall in southern California, reaching 3.40 in (86 mm) in Julian. The rains led to flooding, washing out a road in the Lucerne Valley.
- September 17–19, 1963 – After Tropical Storm Katherine moved ashore Baja California, it produced heavy rainfall across southern California, reaching 6.54 in (166 mm) at Squirrel Inn. This caused flooding in San Bernardino.
- September 4–5, 1965 – Hurricane Emily dissipated west of Baja California, spreading light rainfall across California of less than 1 in (25 mm).
- August 30–31, 1967 – Hurricane Katrina produced rainfall across southern California as it traversed much of the Gulf of California, reaching over 2 in (51 mm). Floods damaged more than 150 buildings, and several roads across the Coachella Valley were flooded.

=== 1970s ===
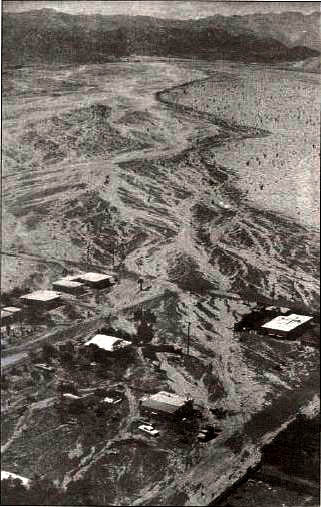
Aerial image of damage in Ocotillo caused by Tropical Storm Kathleen in September 1976

- September 30–October 1, 1971 – Hurricane Olivia, which originated in the Atlantic as Hurricane Irene, struck the central Baja California peninsula. The storm dropped roughly 1 in (25 mm) of rainfall in the southern California deserts.
- August 12–13, 1972 – Moisture from Hurricane Diana spread across southern California, reaching 2.1 in (53 mm) within one hour at Lucerne Valley. The rains caused flash flooding, closing a portion of I-15, and washing out railroads.
- September 3, 1972 – Former Hurricane Hyacinth made landfall just north of San Diego as a tropical depression, marking the first California landfall of a tropical cyclone since 1939. Flash flooding from the storm caused I-40 to close for two hours, and rail lines were damaged.
- October 5, 1972 – Tropical Storm Joanne made landfall along the western Baja California peninsula, and its remnants brought rainfall to the deserts of southeastern California.
- September 10, 1976 – Tropical Storm Kathleen struck the western Baja California peninsula while interacting with another low pressure area off southern California. This fueled a large area of heavy rainfall, and the interaction accelerated Kathleen's circulation across Death Valley into Nevada. Rainfall peaked at 14.76 in (375 mm) along the southern slopes of Mount San Gorgonio, which marked the highest known precipitation related to an Atlantic or Pacific hurricane in the state. Flooding inundated the Coachella and Imperial Valleys, with six people killed in Ocotillo, after 70% of the town was buried in mud. Five other people died elsewhere in the state, including in Los Angeles and El Centro. The floods also washed out portions of roads, including I-8. Damage in the state was estimated at over $120 million.
- August 15–17, 1977 – Former Hurricane Doreen dissipated near San Clemente Island, after bringing a plume of moisture that spread across southern California. The highest rainfall was 7.63 in (194 mm) along Mt. San Jacinto. The storm killed four people and caused $25 million in damage, with hundreds of houses flooded.
- October 6–7, 1977 – The remnants of Hurricane Heather produced 2 in (51 mm) of rainfall in southern California.
- September 5–6, 1978 – Tropical Depression Norman made landfall near Long Beach, generating 7.01 in (178 mm) of rainfall at Lodgepole Campground. The storm also produced a rare summer blizzard along Mount Whitney, killing four hikers from hypothermia. Norman also caused about $300 million in agriculture damage, with about 95% of the raisin crop ruined.

=== 1980s ===
- June 29–30, 1980 – Moisture from Hurricane Celia produced light rainfall in southern California.
- September 17–18, 1982 – Hurricane Norman dissipated southwest of Mexico, although its remnants generated light rains across the southwestern United States, reaching 1 in (25 mm) in Cuyamaca.
- September 24–26, 1982 – The interaction between a shortwave trough and the remnants of Hurricane Olivia produced heavy rainfall across the western United States, reaching 7.54 in (192 mm) at General Grant Grove. The rains caused a dam to burst, forcing residents in Bishop to evacuate. Olivia caused heavy agriculture damage in the state, estimated at $325 million.
- August 11–14, 1983 – Hurricane Ismael generated high waves that killed a woman in Orange County. The storm's remnants also spread rainfall across the state, reaching 5.85 in (149 mm), which resulted in flooding that killed three people in San Bernardino.
- September 20–21, 1983 – After dissipating offshore, the remnants of Hurricane Manuel produced 2.85 in (72 mm) of rain in the deserts of southern California.
- October 7, 1983 – The remnants of Hurricane Priscilla caused light rain showers across southern California.
- July 14, 1984 – High waves from Hurricane Genevieve killed a surfer in Huntington Beach. The storm also spread rainfall across the southwestern United States, reaching 1.15 in (29 mm) in Borrego Springs.
- September 10–11, 1984 – Hurricane Marie dissipated west of Baja California, although it spread rainfall across the southwestern United States. Its weak remnants generated showers over Southern California. Rough surf up to 10 ft (3.0 m) at Huntington Beach drowned a man.
- July 12, 1985 – Tropical Depression Guillermo dissipated southwest of the state, spreading light rainfall across the state.
- September 19–24, 1985 – Dissipating Hurricane Terry interacted with a cold front to produce rainfall across southern California, which produced floods that washed out roads along the northern coast of the Salton Sea.
- September 22–23, 1987 – The remnants of Hurricane Norma generated thunderstorms over Southern California, which caused some flooding.
- October 5–12, 1987 – Dissipating Hurricane Ramon produced rainfall across southern California, reaching 2.14 inches (54 mm) at Camp Pendleton. The rains caused street flooding that caused dozens of traffic accidents.
- October 30–31, 1987 – The remnants of Tropical Storm Selma dropped rainfall across southern California, reaching 0.61 in (15 mm) at Camp Pendleton. The rains caused traffic accidents that killed three people and injured 25 others. There was also a landslide along the Antelope Valley Freeway and Soledad Canyon Road.
- September 17–18, 1989 – The remnants of Hurricane Octave moved across the state, producing rainfall and cloudiness that led to $100 million worth of agriculture damage.

=== 1990s ===
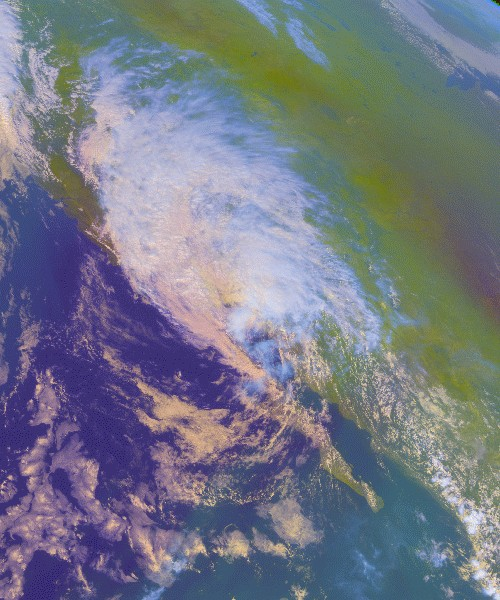
The remnants of Hurricane Nora over the southwestern United States

- June 9–10, 1990 – The remnants of Hurricane Boris produced scattered rainfall across southern California, reaching 1.41 in (36 mm) at Mount Laguna. In San Diego, rainfall reached 0.76 in (19 mm), contributing to the city's wettest June on record.
- August 12–14, 1991 – Dissipating Tropical Storm Hilda spread rainfall across southern California, causing flash flooding in mountainous areas.
- July 1992 – The remnants of Hurricane Darby caused cloudiness in California. These clouds were also enough to delay the landing of the Space Shuttle Columbia for a day, and cause it to land in Florida instead of California.
- August 23, 1992 – The outskirts of Tropical Storm Lester produced thunderstorms across the deserts of southern California, which produced flash flooding in Death Valley and along US 95 and CA 62.
- August 25–26, 1993 – After making landfall in northwestern Mexico, the remnants of Hurricane Hilary dropped 3 to 4 in (76 to 102 mm) of rainfall across the deserts of California, producing flash flooding. In the Morongo Valley, the floods damaged at least 15 houses.
- August 5, 1997 – Surf from Hurricane Guillermo caused rip currents near Corona Del Mar, and a place just north of Huntington Beach, injuring three people and killing one.
- August 19–20, 1997 – The remnants of Tropical Storm Ignacio produced rainfall across the state, peaking at 2.16 in (55 mm). In San Francisco, the rainfall total of around 1 in (25 mm) made it the wettest August on record. The storm also interacted with a ridge to produce gale-force winds across the state, which spread wildfires.
- September 13–14, 1997 – After Hurricane Linda became one of the strongest Pacific hurricanes on record, computer models anticipated that the storm could make landfall in southern California. Ultimately, Linda remained offshore, generating high surf that washed five people off a jetty in Newport Beach, who were rescued by a passing boat. The storm also generated thunderstorms and rainfall in the state, leading to flash flooding and landslides that damaged or destroyed 79 homes.
- September 24 – 26, 1997 – After making landfall in Baja California, Tropical Storm Nora crossed into the southwestern United States near the border of California and Arizona. Strong winds led to power outages that affected at least 125,000 people in the Los Angeles area. The main impacts were from heavy rainfall, which peaked at 5.50 in (140 mm) along Mount San Jacinto. The rains led to hundreds of traffic accidents, leading to four fatalities. High surf, with waves 20 ft (6.1 m) high, affected coastal areas from San Diego to Orange County, entering a few houses.
- August 9–10, 1998 – The remnants of Tropical Storm Frank spread light rainfall across southern California, reaching 0.76 in (19 mm) at Palomar Mountain.
- September 3, 1998 – After Hurricane Isis moved ashore northwestern Mexico, it produced light rainfall in the state, reaching 1.53 in (39 mm) at Frazier Park. The scattered rainfall led to about $5 million in agriculture damage.

=== 2000s ===
- September 13–14, 2000 – Hurricane Lane lashed the coast with 12 ft (3.7 m) waves, before the storm dissipated west of the state. The remnants of Lane triggered thunderstorms across California.
- September 2–3, 2001 – The remnants of Hurricane Flossie produced thunderstorms across southern California. Lightning struck four people, killing two of them. The rains also led to flash flooding and landslides in the San Bernardino Mountains.
- September 30, 2001 – While over the northern Gulf of California, Tropical Depression Juliette produced thunderstorms and a dust storm across the Coachella Valley, with a wind gust of 39 mph (63 km/h) recorded at Palm Springs International Airport. The winds knocked down trees and power lines.
- September 3–4, 2002 – High surf from distant but powerful Hurricane Hernan lashed the southern California coast with rip currents and up to 20 ft (6.1 m) waves.
- November 8–9, 2002 – Former Hurricane Huko interacted with a trough and produced rainfall across southern and central California, as well as a snowstorm in the Sierras that generated 80 in (6.7 ft) of snowfall at Chagoopa Plateau.
- August 26, 2003 – The remnants of Hurricane Ignacio produced thunderstorms across central California that generated 14 fires from lightning strikes, as well as causing power outages that affected 3,500 people.
- September 5–6, 2004 – High surf from Hurricane Howard hit the southern California coastline with 6 to 12 ft (1.8 to 3.7 m) waves, which led to more than 1,000 lifeguard rescues over the busy Labor Day Weekend.
- September 20, 2004 – The remnants of Hurricane Javier dropped 0.08 in (2.0 mm) of rainfall at Needles.
- July 23, 2005 – The remnants of Atlantic Hurricane Emily generated thunderstorms across southern California, producing rainfall that reached 1.50 in (38 mm) in Hemet.
- September 20, 2005 – Thunderstorms generated by the remnants of Hurricane Max ignited the Pine Fire northeast of Bakersfield, which burned 1,814 acres (734 ha) of grasslands.
- July 2006 – Thunderstorms and rainfall from the remnants of Tropical Storm Emilia helped extinguish the Horse Fire northeast of San Diego.
- September 6, 2006 – Thunderstorms from the remnants of Hurricane John brought some flash floods and mudslides to the Inland Empire.
- August 26–27, 2007 – The remnants of Atlantic Hurricane Dean triggered thunderstorms across southern California, reaching 2.13 in (54 mm) at Lake Wohlford. The rains led to flash floods in Escondido and Borrego Springs.
- October 29, 2007 – Moisture from the remnants of Tropical Storm Kiko combined with a cold front produced thunderstorms and flash flooding in Central California. The deluge trapped vehicles and caused the roof of a factory in Fresno to collapse.
- July 11, 2009 – The remnants of Tropical Storm Blanca brought cloudy conditions and some very light showers across portions of the state like the Bay Area.
- September 4, 2009 – After Hurricane Jimena struck the Baja California peninsula, its moisture generated thunderstorms across parts of southern California. Flash floods occurred in Ocotillo.
- October 11–15, 2009 – The remnants of Typhoon Melor fueled a trough that dropped torrential rainfall across California, reaching 21.34 in (542 mm) in Monterey County. The rains led to flash flooding and landslides, while higher elevations experienced snowfall. In addition, the storm produced strong winds across the state, leading to dust storms and traffic accidents that killed three people in Buttonwillow.

=== 2010s ===
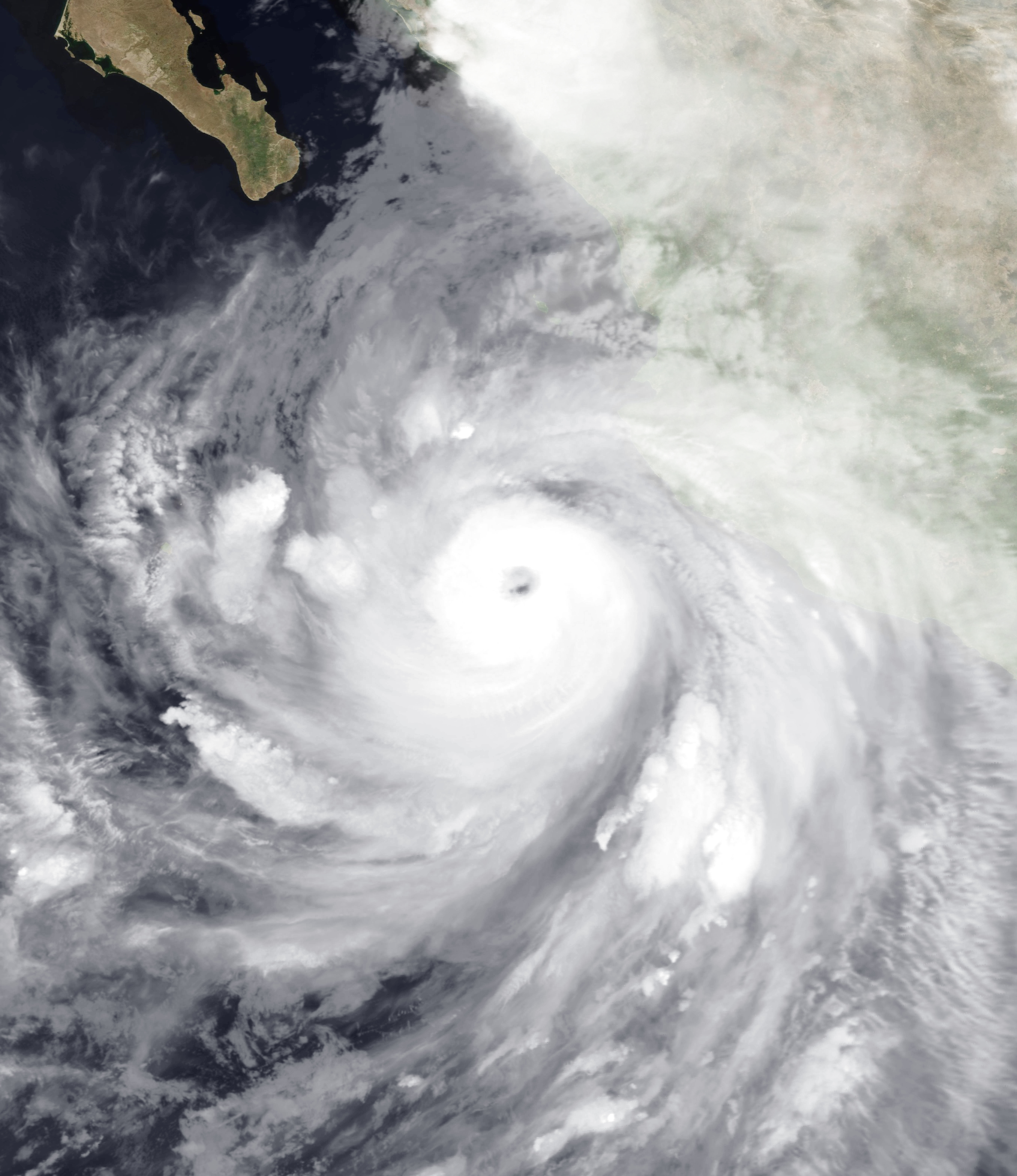
Hurricane Odile in 2014 near peak intensity southwest of Mexico

- July 18–20, 2012 – The remnants of Hurricane Fabio travelled north through California and Nevada into the Pacific Northwest, producing light rainfall in some parts of California and setting daily rainfall records in locations which typically get little or no rainfall in July.
- September 5–7, 2012 – Moisture from the remnants of Tropical Storm John brought light, scattered showers to portions of the state, helping to aid in fighting fires in the San Gabriel Mountains.
- August 25–26, 2013 – Thunderstorms generated by the remnants of Tropical Storm Ivo produced flash flooding that inundated a mobile home park in Borrego Springs.
- August 26–29, 2014 – Large swells from Hurricane Marie caused high waves that killed a surfer in Malibu.
- September 8, 2014 – While dissipating west of the Baja California peninsula, Hurricane Norbert generated thunderstorms and 2 in (0.051 m) of rainfall, leading to mudslides and flash flooding in the deserts of southern California. The floods washed out a bridge along U.S. 66 southwest of Essex.
- September 16–17, 2014 – After Hurricane Odile struck the southern Baja California peninsula, it sent a plume of moisture into southern California that produced thunderstorms and flash flooding, leaving 6,000 people around San Diego without power. High winds also uprooted trees and flipped at least one airplane at Montgomery Field Airport.
- October 6–7, 2014 – High surf from Hurricane Simon caused coastal flooding and rip currents.
- June 9-10, 2015 – The remnants of Hurricane Blanca brought showers to much of Southern California on June 9, breaking rainfall records there. The system also generated thunderstorms in San Luis Obispo County, which led to flash flooding and a few mudslides. On June 10, the low-pressure system moved north and brought scattered showers to the San Francisco Bay Area, breaking many rainfall records there as well. Lightning from the system also sparked many wildfires in Northern California.
- July 18–19, 2015 – Moisture from former Hurricane Dolores produced thunderstorms across southern California, with rainfall totals of up to 4 in (100 mm). Lightning struck and killed a man in Bakersfield. The thunderstorms ignited a few wildfires, and also led to the first rainout of a Los Angeles Angels baseball game since 1995. The floods also washed out a bridge along I-10 near Desert Center, temporarily shutting off the primary Phoenix-to-Los-Angeles route.
- September 8–15, 2015 – A plume of moisture from Hurricane Linda produced thunderstorms across southern California, leading to flash flooding that killed one person trying to cross the Mill Creek. The storm also produced urban flooding across Los Angeles and Orange counties.
- July 11–12, 2017 – Distant Hurricane Eugene lashed the southern California coast with rip currents and 6 to 8 ft (1.8 to 2.4 m) waves, leading to hundreds of people requiring lifeguard rescue.
- September 3–4, 2017 – After traversing the Baja California peninsula, Tropical Storm Lidia produced scattered thunderstorms across southern California. In Santa Barbara, the thunderstorms triggered a microburst with winds of 80 mph (130 km/h), strong enough to knock down a power line, injuring a man.
- July 6–8, 2018 – Swells from distant Hurricane Fabio brought rip currents and high surf up to 12 ft (3.7 m) along the state's southern coastline.
- September 30 – October 1, 2018 – Moisture from Tropical Storm Rosa produced thunderstorms and flash flooding, killing a driver near Mecca.
- October 12, 2018 – Tropical Storm Sergio struck the Baja California peninsula, and it spread thunderstorms across southern California, triggering flash floods in the Coachella Valley. Floodwaters along I-10 reached 1.5 ft (0.46 m) near Cactus City.
- November 20, 2019 – The remnants of Tropical Storm Raymond brought a heavy rainfall and snow in the mountains in Southern California, resulting in flooding along CA 99 in the Central Valley. Along the Tijuana River, two people required rescue from floods.

=== 2020s ===
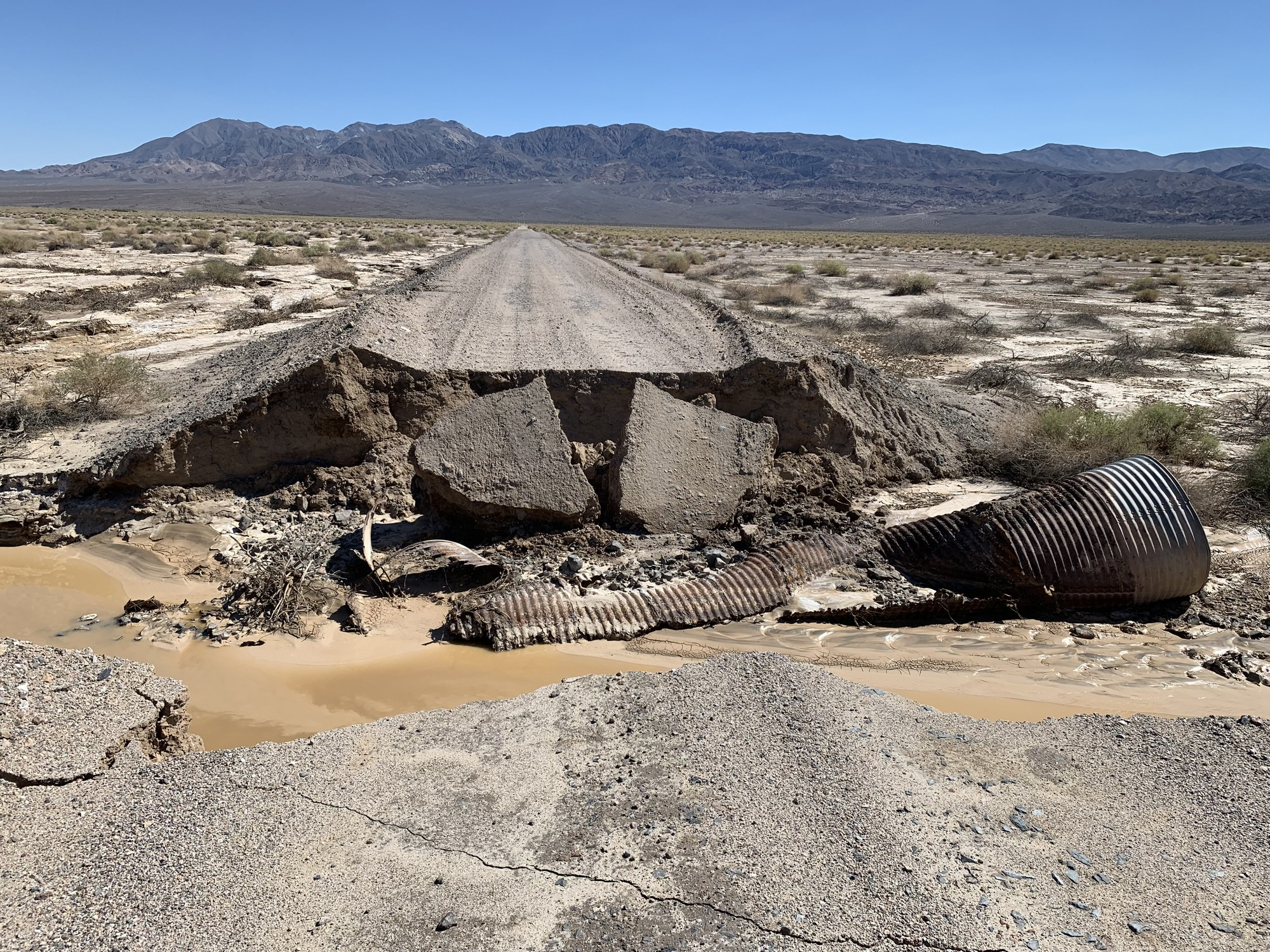
Road damage in Death Valley National Park from Hurricane Hilary

- August 16–17, 2020 – Moisture from Tropical Storm Fausto triggered massive thunderstorms across portions of Northern California. The thunderstorms produced mostly dry lightning, and sparked 367 wildfires across the state, several of which quickly exploded in size, threatening thousands of buildings and forcing thousands of people to evacuate. The massive SCU Lightning Complex, August Complex, CZU Lightning Complex, and North Complex fires were connected to the thunderstorms associated with Fausto. In San Francisco, a tree fell during the high winds, and thunderstorms produced wind gusts up to 60 mph (95 km/h).
- August 22, 2020 – Remnant moisture from Hurricane Genevieve brought heavy rain to parts of Southern California, where a few large wildfires were occurring at the time.
- October 10, 2020 – Remnant moisture from Hurricane Marie was entrained into an extratropical cyclone heading towards the West Coast of the U.S., which brought heavy rain to parts of Northern California.
- September 9–10, 2022 – Tropical Storm Kay transitioned into a post-tropical cyclone off the southern California coast, although its moisture produced heavy rainfall over several days. Mount Laguna recorded 5.85 in (149 mm) of rainfall. The rains led to mudslides and debris flow, killing one woman in Forest Falls. A strong pressure gradient produced strong downslope winds, reaching 109 mph (175 km/h) on Cuyamaca Peak. The strong winds caused widespread power outages, affecting more than 63,000 people.
- August 9–13, 2023 – Remnant moisture from Tropical Storm Eugene caused isolated thunderstorms and light winds, with minimal rainfall in Southern California. The remnants moved further north and brought isolated thunderstorms to the Sierra Nevada and the San Francisco Bay Area.
- August 20–21, 2023 – Former Hurricane Hilary dissipated over Baja California, producing a widespread area of strong winds and heavy rainfall across Southern California. The highest rainfall total was 13.07 in (332 mm). Flash flooding swept away a mobile home in Angelus Oaks, killing a woman. The floods also washed away roads, damaged houses, and caused mudslides. The region was drenched by record-breaking heavy rainfall and strong winds, flooding roads, and causing mudslides and rock slides. Wind gusts reached 87 mph (140 km/h) at Magic Mountain. The remnants also brought wind and thunderstorms to Northern California, including parts of both the Greater Sacramento area and the San Francisco Bay Area.
- September 8, 2023 – Hurricane Jova produced high waves and rip currents, resulting in five people requiring rescue.
- August 28, 2025 – Remnant moisture from Tropical Storm Juliette brought light rain to San Diego.
- September 17, 2025 – Remnant moisture from Tropical Storm Mario brought widespread rain and thunderstorms to many parts of California, causing flash flooding and mudslides. In Barstow, floodwaters swept away a vehicle, killing a toddler.
- September 30, 2025 – The remnants of Hurricane Narda brought high surf to Newport Beach. At least 80 people were rescued from rip currents generated by the storm.
- October 10, 2025 – The remnants of Hurricane Priscilla produced thunderstorms and 49 mph (79 km/h) wind gusts in Riverside County.
- October 13, 2025 – The remnants of Tropical Storm Raymond caused heavy rainfall and flash flooding in San Bernardino County.
- September 5–9, 2026 – Although Hurricane Marie remained hundreds of miles offshore and never made landfall, a large south swell from the storm produced surf of up to 10 ft (3.0 m) at south-facing beaches in Southern California, coinciding with evening high tides above 7 ft (2.1 m). High surf and coastal flood advisories were in effect for Los Angeles, Ventura, and Orange counties over the Labor Day weekend, and seawater flooded streets, parking lots, and homes in Seal Beach, Malibu, and Long Beach. On the Alamitos Peninsula in Long Beach, waves breached a seawall and damaged the boardwalk, prompting the evacuation of about 20 oceanfront homes along Seaside Walk on September 7; at least 12 garages were damaged. Malibu declared a local emergency after erosion opened a sinkhole and caused a gas leak along Sea Level Drive, while severe bluff erosion left drop-offs about 8 ft (2.4 m) high at Point Dume. Along Beach Road in the Capistrano Bay District of Dana Point, eight homes were declared uninhabitable and one partially collapsed into the ocean. Rain from the storm's outer bands fell across Los Angeles County, the San Bernardino Mountains, and the High Desert.
- October 9–11, 2026 – Hurricane Rachel, which had peaked as a Category 3 hurricane, weakened over cooler waters and became post-tropical before moving ashore in far northern Baja California on October 10. The National Hurricane Center issued a tropical storm watch for San Diego County, only the second for California after Hurricane Hilary in 2023. Rainfall reached nearly 4 in (100 mm) on Palomar Mountain and 1.55 in (39 mm) in Oceanside. Swells from Rachel produced life-threatening surf and coastal flooding along the Southern California coast. Surf breached sand berms in Long Beach and Newport Beach, partially submerging oceanfront homes, and battered homes and the boardwalk on the Alamitos Peninsula in Long Beach. Rockslides temporarily blocked some roads.

== Statistics ==
Most tropical cyclones impacting California do so in the month of September. September 1939 was "unprecedented" in having four tropical cyclones impact the state.

Number of recorded storms affecting California, by month of year
Month	Number of storms
January	0
February	0
March	0
April	0
May	0
June	3
July	13
August	27
September	52
October	15
November	2
December	0

Excludes three pre-1900 systems whose month is unknown.

Number of recorded storms affecting California by decade
Period	Number of storms
Pre-1900	5
1900–1909	2
1910s	3
1920s	4
1930s	7
1940s	4
1950s	5
1960s	4
1970s	8
1980s	14
1990s	11
2000s	17
2010s	16
2020s	14

== Deadly storms ==
The following is a list of all known tropical cyclone-related deaths in California.

Name	Year	Number of deaths
El Cordonazo	1939	45–93
Unnamed	1932	15
Kathleen	1976	11
Doreen	1977	4
Norman	1978	4
Ismael	1983	4
Nora	1997	4
Selma	1987	3
Melor	2009	3
Flossie	2001	2
Marie	1984	1
Guillermo	1997	1
Marie	2014	1
Dolores	2015	1
Linda	2015	1
Rosa	2018	1
Kay	2022	1
Hilary	2023	1
Mario	2025	1

== See also ==
- List of Arizona hurricanes
- List of Baja California Peninsula hurricanes
- Climate of California

- List of California floods
- List of California tornadoes
- List of California wildfires
- Santa Ana winds. Winds capable of hurricane-force speeds.
