= Hurricane Norman (1978) =

Category 4 Pacific hurricane in 1978

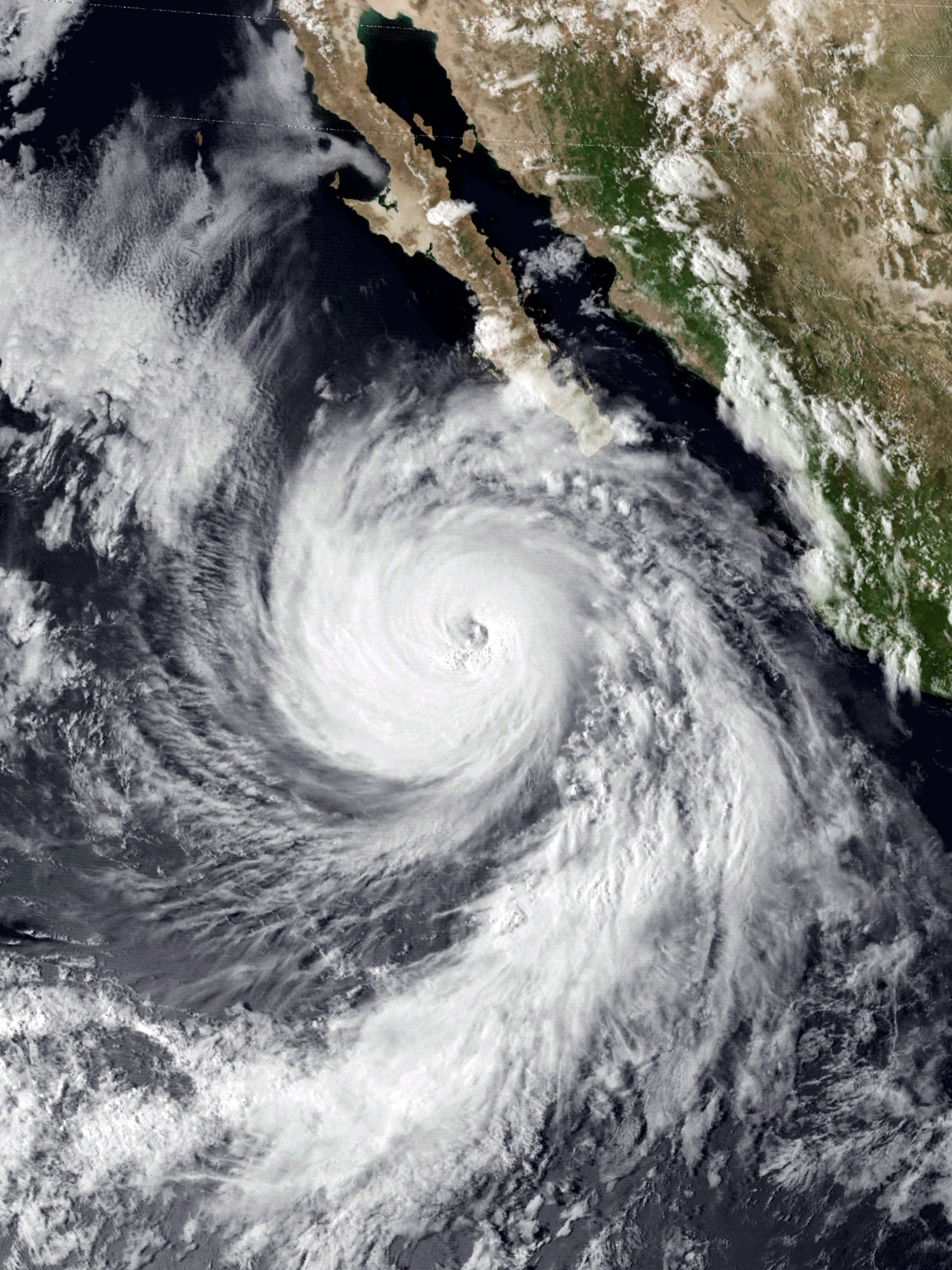
- Hurricane Norman at peak intensity south of the Baja Peninsula on September 2

Meteorological history
- Formed: August 30, 1978
- Dissipated: September 6, 1978

Category 4 major hurricane
- 1-minute sustained (SSHWS/NWS)
- Highest winds: 140 mph (220 km/h)

Overall effects
- Fatalities: 8
- Missing: 4
- Damage: $300 million (1978 USD)
- Areas affected: Mexico, California, Nevada
- IBTrACS
- Part of the 1978 Pacific hurricane season

Hurricane Norman was a rare tropical cyclone that impacted California in early September 1978. The fourteenth named storm, eleventh hurricane, and sixth major hurricane of the 1978 Pacific season, Norman originated from a tropical wave that spawned an area of disturbed weather south of Acapulco. The system coalesced into a tropical depression on August 30 and thrived amid favorable environmental conditions, becoming a powerful Category 4 hurricane with winds of 140 mph (230 km/h) at its peak intensity. The system curved northward, passing into cooler waters that brought an end to its status as a tropical cyclone on September 6. However, its remnants combined with an trough and front over California, contributing to locally heavy rainfall that caused dozens of traffic accidents and sporadic power outages. In higher elevations, the system produced accumulating snow which stranded and killed many hikers throughout Sierra Nevada. Most heavily affected was California's raisin crop, which suffered a record-breaking 95 percent loss. Overall, Norman killed eight people and caused over $300 million in damage.

== Meteorological history ==
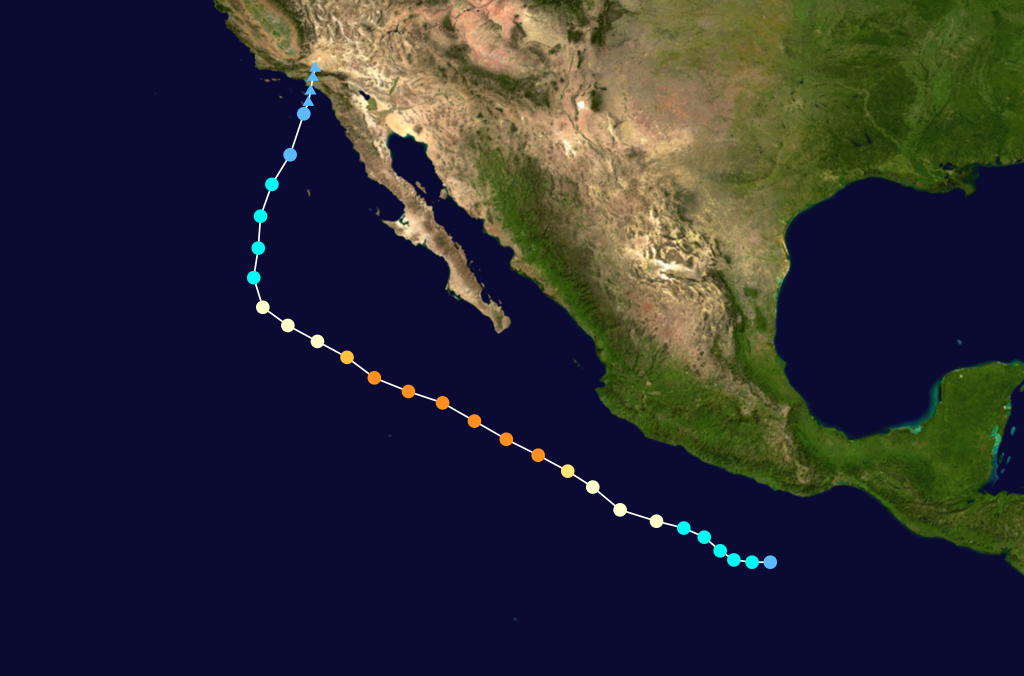
Map plotting the storm's track and intensity, according to the Saffir–Simpson scale Map key Saffir–Simpson scale Tropical depression (≤38 mph, ≤62 km/h) Tropical storm (39–73 mph, 63–118 km/h) Category 1 (74–95 mph, 119–153 km/h) Category 2 (96–110 mph, 154–177 km/h) Category 3 (111–129 mph, 178–208 km/h) Category 4 (130–156 mph, 209–251 km/h) Category 5 (≥157 mph, ≥252 km/h) Unknown Storm type Tropical cyclone Subtropical cyclone Extratropical cyclone, remnant low, tropical disturbance, or monsoon depression

At 18:00 UTC on August 29, an area of disturbed weather was first observed about 460 miles (740 km) southeast of Acapulco. This disturbance appeared to have ties to a tropical wave that originated from Africa. The system moved west and organized, becoming a tropical depression by 18:00 UTC on August 30 and further intensifying into Tropical Storm Norman six hours later. The newly formed system curved toward the west-northwest and tracked over sea surface temperatures of 85 °F (29 °C), which continued to facilitate its development. Norman intensified into a hurricane by 06:00 UTC on September 1 while it was located about 265 miles (426 km) southwest of Acapulco. A few hours later, forecasters at the Eastern Pacific Hurricane Center observed the system's small eye for the first time via visible satellite imagery.

Norman intensified rapidly on September 2. It intensified into a Category 2 hurricane on the Saffir–Simpson scale around 00:00 UTC but vaulted to Category 4 intensity six hours later. Around this time, the Asia Honesty – passing about 35 miles (56 km) north of Norman's center – recorded easterly winds up to 107 mph (172 km/h), along with ocean waves up to 41 ft (12 m) in height. The hurricane passed over the northeastern coast of Socorro Island between 17:00–18:00 UTC on September 2. A few hours later, the first aircraft reconnaissance plane intercepted the cyclone, reporting a closed eyewall 45 miles (72 km) in diameter. Data from that mission was used to raise Norman's winds to 140 mph (230 km/h), the storm's peak intensity. Upper-level high pressure centered over Baja California continued to direct the cyclone west-northwest, which brought the system over increasingly cool waters.

A second aircraft reconnaissance plane investigated Norman around 18:00 UTC on September 3, and the storm was operationally downgraded to a Category 2 hurricane as its inner core became ill-defined. Later analysis suggests that the hurricane weakened to Category 3 intensity at this time. By September 4, Norman was located on the southwest side of upper-level ridging and embedded within strong southwesterly flow aloft. This caused the system to curve north and then north-northeast over sharply colder water around 68 °F (20 °C). It rapidly weakened to Category 1 intensity by 00:00 UTC that day before falling under hurricane intensity eighteen hours later. The Hurricane Hunters intercepted Norman for a final time around 17:30 UTC on September 5. The cyclone barely maintained tropical storm-force winds at that time, and indeed, it was downgraded to a tropical depression 30 minutes later. Norman's final advisory was written at 00:00 UTC on September 6, when it was located about 25 miles (40 km) south of San Clemente Island off the coastline of California. The former hurricane accelerated north-northeast, transitioning into an extratropical cyclone around 06:00 UTC on September 6. It degenerated to a disturbance northeast of Los Angeles after 00:00 UTC on September 7.

== Preparations and impact ==
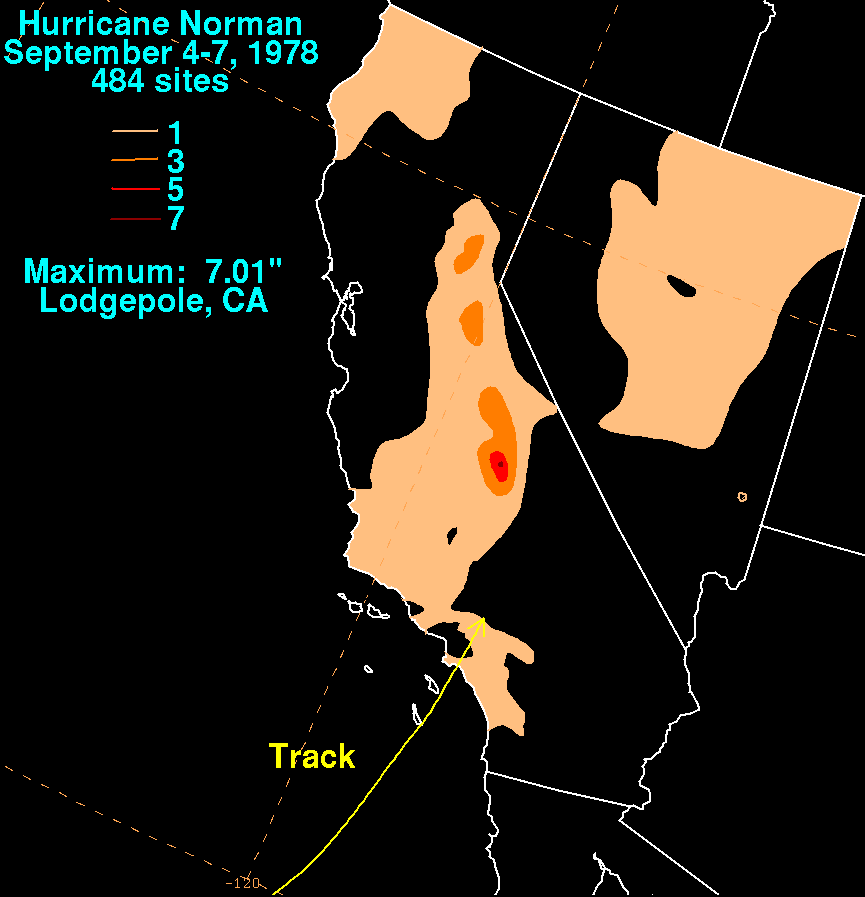
Accumulating rainfall produced by Norman

Offshore the coastline of Mexico, the bodies of a father and one of his sons were recovered after rough seas overwhelmed their boat. The father's second son washed ashore while unconscious and was transported to a hospital in Cabo San Lucas by two hikers, where communications were severed in the wake of the cyclone. Meanwhile, in advance of Norman in California, a weather front contributed to rainfall that staved off wildfire risk in a normally dry time of the year there. However, as this front interacted with the remnants of the cyclone, it prompted flash flood and mudslide warnings across southern portions of the state, in addition to heavy surf and small craft advisories along the coast. Waves of 6–9 ft (1.8–2.7 m), locally as high as 15 ft (4.6 m) along south-facing beaches in North County, were expected. Rough seas battered the coastline, with waves up to 10 ft (3.0 m) observed at Newport Beach and 8 ft (2.4 m) at Imperial Beach. Hundreds of rescues were carried out by lifeguards, including a record 586 people at Newport Beach, an additional 200 individuals throughout Orange County, 62 people at all San Diego beaches, and 10 swimmers in Coronado. Two ships were slammed into their berths and a third had its steel mooring cable snapped in the Port of Los Angeles. A 10,000 t (10,000,000 kg) oil tanker was also swept from its moorings. In Orange County, a 262 ft (80 m) vessel and two barges were ripped from their anchors and ran aground in Dana Point Harbor.

The remnants of Norman combined with an upper-level trough over California to produce locally heavy rainfall. Although accumulations were lower than expected and allowed forecasters to expire the preexisting flash flood warnings, a rainfall maxima of 7.01 in (178 mm) was still recorded at Lodgepole Campground. These rains slowed an outbreak of botulism among anseriformes in Tulare Lake, cutting weekly fatality rates in half. Several baseball games were canceled or rescheduled. Traffic accidents were reported along freeways between San Diego and Santa Barbara, including 21 traffic collisions with injuries near Ontario. One such accident on U.S. Route 50 near Twin Bridges resulted in the death of a 24-year-old man who collided head-on with another vehicle after swerving to avoid large rocks that had washed onto the road. Both the passenger of his vehicle, and the driver of the vehicle he collided with, were severely injured and hospitalized. On Interstate 10 in California, 8,500 US gal (32,000 L) gasoline truck collided with a tanker truck carrying nitrogen, causing the death of one man owing to severe head injuries as well as the hospitalization of the passenger. A truck overturned in a separate accident, spilling scrap iron over three lanes of the freeway and injuring one man as well. A 16-year-old boy was hospitalized after wrecking his car on wet roads in Riverside. California State Route 180 was closed for a time after being eclipsed by rocks and water. A portion of a street collapsed in Point Loma, San Diego. The storm also contributed to localized power outages affecting 15,000 customers, including 2,000 homes in Mission Bay, La Jolla, and Del Mar. These outages were primarily caused by power pole fires resultant from rainfall moistening an accumulation of dust on the insulators. Norman caused severe crop losses throughout California. The raisin crop in particular suffered the state's largest loss on record, with 95 percent of that crop destroyed. Agricultural losses exceeded $300 million. The cyclone inflicted an additional $300,000 in damage to roads, bridges, and private property across Inyo County.

Moisture from the storm contributed to accumulating snow up to 5 in (13 cm) across the Sierra Nevada, catching many hikers off-guard. The bodies of three men and a woman were recovered at higher elevations. All four of the deceased were dressed in summer-like clothing and had little other equipment with them. The freshly laid snow, followed by a blanket of fog across the region, slowed rescue efforts. Some 21 hikers near Convict Lake and Mount McGee were stranded but later recovered, and 3 others near Lake Italy were rescued as well. Initial reports suggested 17 hikers were also missing around Mount Whitney, but these individuals were later said to be part of a search and rescue team. Chains were temporarily required along Nevada State Route 431, and a traveler advisory was issued across northeastern portions of the state. Meanwhile, a hang glider was reported missing on Mount Shasta after he was met by strong winds at an elevation of 11,000 ft (3,400 m). A plane, harboring three travelers on a route from Porterville, California, to Reno, Nevada, also went missing in a mixture of rain and snow produced by the remnants of Norman and a nearby front. The Civil Air Patrol established search headquarters and readied aircraft to search the Sierra Nevada.

== See also ==
- Other storms named Norman
- 1858 San Diego Hurricane
- 1939 California tropical storm
- Hurricane Ismael (1983)
- Hurricane Ramon
- List of California hurricanes
