= Hurricane Linda (2015) =

Category 3 Pacific hurricane in 2015

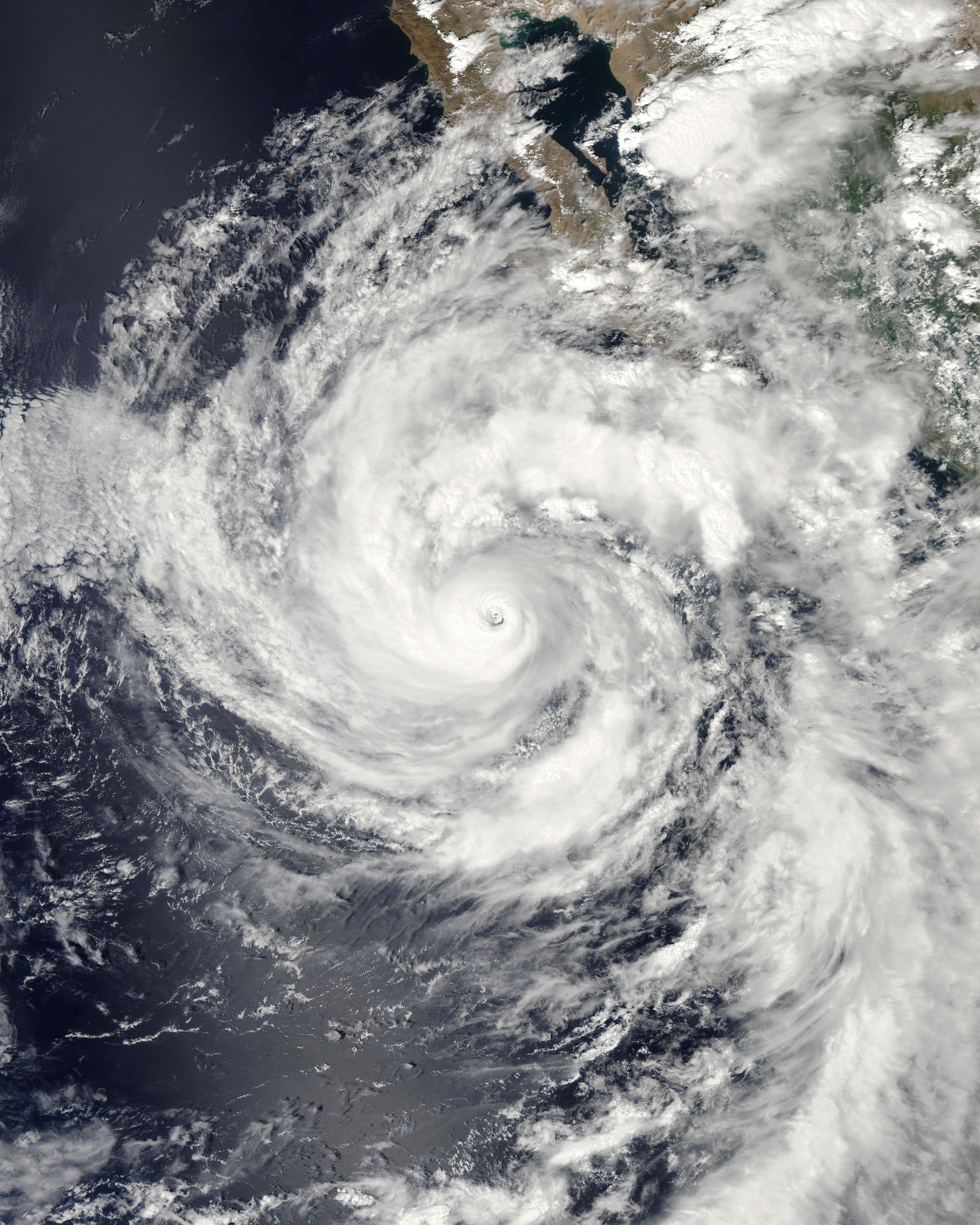
- Hurricane Linda at peak intensity on September 8

Meteorological history
- Formed: September 5, 2015
- Remnant low: September 10, 2015
- Dissipated: September 14, 2015

Category 3 major hurricane
- 1-minute sustained (SSHWS/NWS)
- Highest winds: 125 mph (205 km/h)
- Lowest pressure: 950 mbar (hPa); 28.05 inHg

Overall effects
- Fatalities: 22 total
- Damage: $3.59 million (2015 USD)
- Areas affected: Sinaloa, Oaxaca, Zacatecas, Revillagigedo Islands, Southwestern United States
- IBTrACS /
- Part of the 2015 Pacific hurricane season

Hurricane Linda was a strong tropical cyclone in September 2015 that resulted in heavy rains across portions of Mexico and the Southwestern United States. The seventeenth named storm, eleventh hurricane, and eighth major hurricane of the season, Linda developed southwest of Mexico from a low-pressure area on September 5. Under warm sea surface temperatures and low to moderate wind shear, the system intensified into Tropical Storm Linda by September 6 and a hurricane by the next day. A well-defined eye soon formed within the storm's central dense overcast and Linda reached its peak intensity as a 125 mph (205 km/h) Category 3 major hurricane on the Saffir–Simpson hurricane wind scale on September 8. Thereafter, the storm moved into a stable environment and an area of lower sea surface temperatures, causing rapid weakening. Convective activity dissipated and Linda degenerated into a remnant low on September 10. The lingering system persisted southwest of Baja California, ultimately opening up into a trough on September 14.

In Mexico, the storm brought rainfall to nine states, causing flooding, especially in Oaxaca, Sinaloa, and Zacatecas. In Oaxaca, mudslides resulted in the closure of multiple highways and damage to over a dozen homes. Flooding in Sinola affected approximately 1,000 homes with hundreds damaged, prompting dozens of families to evacuate. Several small communities were temporarily isolated after flood waters covered bridges. Localized flooding in Zacatecas damaged crops and 25 dwellings; damage reached approximately 500,000 pesos (US$30,000). Although Linda did not directly impact land, moisture from the storm was pulled northeast into the Southwestern United States and enhanced the local monsoon. Los Angeles received 2.39 in (61 mm) of rain, contributing to the city's second wettest September on record. One fatality in the state occurred from a drowning at San Bernardino National Forest. Utah was impacted by major flash flooding incidents—with rainfall amounting to 1-in-100 year levels—which left 21 deaths in the state: 14 near Hildale and 7 in Zion National Park. This flash flooding ultimately made this the deadliest storm in the history of Utah since at least 1950. Damage across the Southwest amounted to US$3.6 million.

== Meteorological history ==
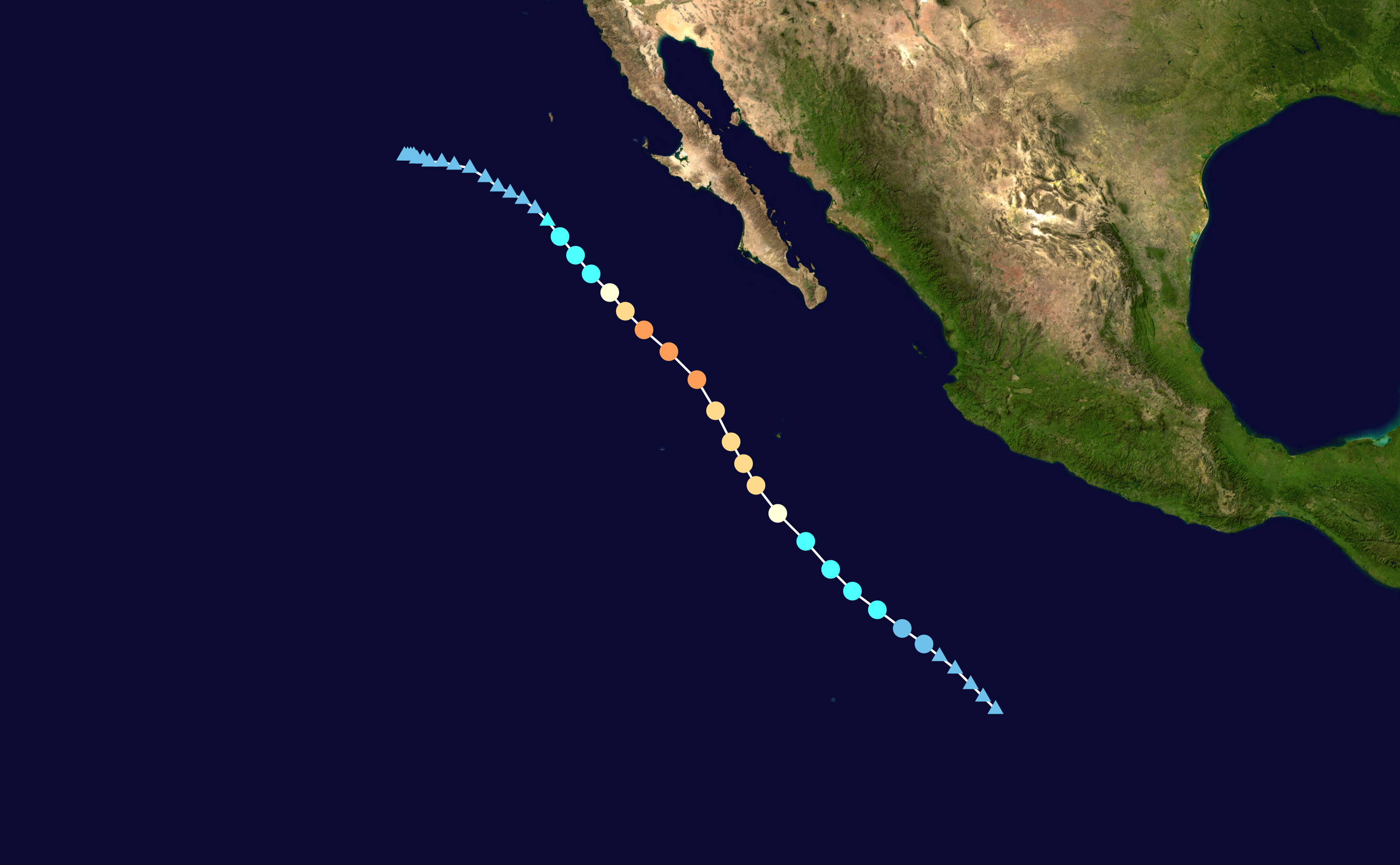
Map plotting the storm's track and intensity, according to the Saffir–Simpson scale Map key Saffir–Simpson scale Tropical depression (≤38 mph, ≤62 km/h) Tropical storm (39–73 mph, 63–118 km/h) Category 1 (74–95 mph, 119–153 km/h) Category 2 (96–110 mph, 154–177 km/h) Category 3 (111–129 mph, 178–208 km/h) Category 4 (130–156 mph, 209–251 km/h) Category 5 (≥157 mph, ≥252 km/h) Unknown Storm type Tropical cyclone Subtropical cyclone Extratropical cyclone, remnant low, tropical disturbance, or monsoon depression

A tropical wave emerged into the Atlantic Ocean from the west coast of Africa on August 21. By four days later, the system spawned Tropical Storm Erika over the eastern Atlantic. The southern portion of the wave persisted westward and moved over Central America on August 30. Shower and thunderstorm activity associated with the wave began to increase over the next few days as it crossed the Gulf of Tehuantepec. Convection was enhanced further on September 2 as a Kelvin wave interacted with the tropical wave, eventually resulting in the development of a broad low-pressure area. Early the following day, the National Hurricane Center (NHC) issued a Tropical Weather Outlook (TWO) for a cluster of convection that showed signs of organizing into a tropical system. Wind shear was forecast to become more conducive for tropical cyclogenesis over the next few days. Although the shear remained moderately strong, the low acquired a well-defined center of circulation by September 4. Following further organization of deep convection, Tropical Depression Fifteen-E developed at 18:00 UTC on September 5 while located about 490 mi (790 km) southwest of Manzanillo, Colima.

Under the influence of a strong mid-level ridge over northern Mexico, the depression moved northwestward into an area of moderate northeasterly vertical wind shear and warm sea surface temperatures. By 06:00 UTC on September 6, the system strengthened into Tropical Storm Linda. Due to a decrease in wind shear, Linda began to undergo rapid deepening shortly thereafter. Between that day and early on September 7, the storm increased in convective banding and developed central dense overcast; satellite imagery also indicated that an eye was forming around that time. At 06:00 UTC on September 7, Linda intensified into a Category 1 hurricane on the Saffir–Simpson hurricane wind scale. Just six hours later, the cyclone reached Category 2 status. Due to a slight increase in wind shear and possibly an intrusion from dry air, Linda temporarily remained steady in intensity while passing between Socorro Island and Clarion Island. Operationally, the NHC briefly downgraded Linda to a Category 1 hurricane at 0:300 UTC on September 8, though post-analysis concluded that the storm remained a Category 2 hurricane.

Strengthening resumed by early on September 8, when the system became a Category 3 hurricane, which coincided with satellite imagery indicating a banded eye feature. Around 12:00 UTC, Linda attained its peak intensity with maximum sustained winds of 125 mph (205 km/h) and a minimum barometric pressure of 950 mbar (28 inHg). Early on September 9, the hurricane rapidly weakened after entering a region of slightly colder sea surface temperatures, falling to Category 2 by 06:00 UTC and to Category 1 intensity only six hours later. Around that time, Linda began encountering a dry, stable air mass and ocean temperature under 26.0 °C (78.8 °F). At 18:00 UTC on September 9, the cyclone weakened to a tropical storm while also losing convective coverage. After the remaining showers and thunderstorms detached from the low-level circulation, Linda transitioned into a post-tropical cyclone around 12:00 UTC the following day while situated about 260 mi (415 km) west-southwest of Punta Eugenia, Baja California Sur. The remnants weakened over the next few days, until degenerating into a trough while still well west of Baja California on September 14.

== Impact and aftermath ==
=== Mexico ===
The outer bands of Linda brought rainfall to nine states across Mexico: Baja California, Baja California Sur, Colima, Jalisco, Nayarit, Sinaloa, Sonora and Zacatecas. Within Sinaloa, flooding affected the municipalities of Angostura, Culiacán, Mazatlán, Rosario, and Salvador Alvarado. Rainfall accumulations peaked at 7.4 in (187 mm) in Rosario. Flooding affected approximately 1,000 homes in the state with hundreds damaged, prompting dozens of families to evacuate. Several small communities were temporarily isolated as flood waters covered bridges. Civil officials declared an emergency for the municipalities of Rosario and Salvador Alvarado in the wake of Linda. Scattered power outages occurred in Mazatlán city. Scattered thunderstorms in Oaxaca resulted in multiple landslides and flooding, prompting closure of several highways and damaging more than a dozen homes. Localized flooding attributed to Linda in Zacatecas damaged crops and 25 homes; losses reached MXN$500,000 (US$27,000). Waves of 6.6 to 9.8 ft (2 to 3 m) likely impacted coastal areas of Baja California, Baja California Sur, Sinaloa, and Sonora. Additionally, Linda passed roughly 100 mi (155 km) west of Socorro Island on September 7; sustained winds reached 28 mph (45 km/h) with gusts to 41 mph (66 km/h).

=== United States ===
==== California ====
Monsoonal moisture pulled north from Linda to produce thunderstorms across portions of California starting on September 8. Victorville and Hesperia, started on September 8 had knocked out electricity. Flooding and rock slides prompted numerous road closures. One person drowned in the San Bernardino National Forest. Moisture from the hurricane's remnants partially contributed to an enhanced monsoon across the Southwestern United States, combining with a seasonable upper-level trough to bring above-average rainfall to many areas. Strong winds from a thunderstorm on September 14 knocked five rail cars off their track, costing insurance companies $1.2 million. On September 15, Los Angeles received 2.39 in (61 mm) of rain, contributing to the city's second-wettest September day since records began in 1877 ― second only to September 25, 1939. Water penetration along State Route 91 in the city resulted in a 50 yd (46 m) crack in the road. Rainfall of 1 to 2 in (25 to 51 mm) was common around San Diego; an underground parking lot in the Midway neighborhood was flooded. Flood-related losses throughout the state reached $912,000. Over 12,000 customers in the Los Angeles Metropolitan Area lost power.

==== Utah ====
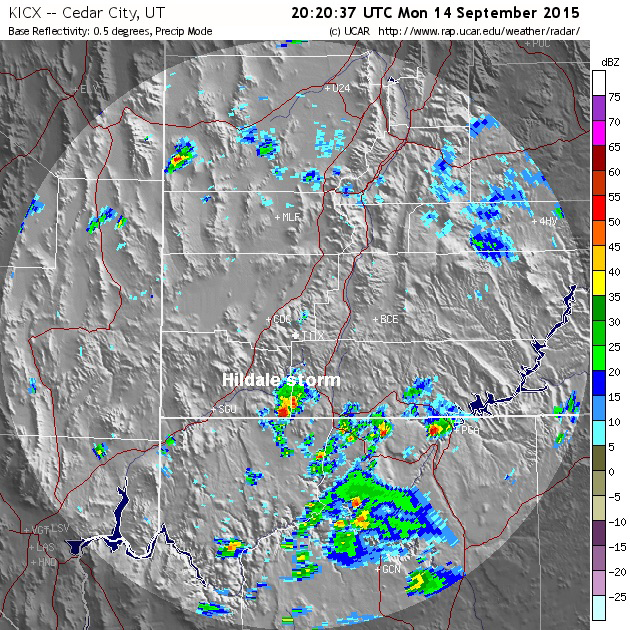
NEXRAD image at 20:20 UTC (2:20 p.m. MDT) on September 14, depicting a thunderstorm over Hildale, Utah that produced deadly flash floods

After degenerating into a remnant low on September 10, moisture associated with the former tropical cyclone spread across the Southwestern United States. Aided by above-average water vapor levels and the aforementioned upper-level trough, scattered thunderstorms developed across the region on September 14. Two major incidents of flash flooding resulted in 21 deaths in Utah, the deadliest flash flood event in the state's history. The previous deadliest event was on August 13, 1923, when seven people died near Farmington. Flash floods occur annually in Washington County, Utah, with an average of one to two flash flood days per year since 1950.

During the afternoon of September 14, two successive thunderstorms produced more than 2 in (51 mm) of rain—a 1-in-100 year event—near Hildale, Utah in Washington County. The National Weather Service issued a strongly worded flash flood warning at 20:22 UTC (2:22 p.m. MDT) for the area, stating "Move to higher ground now. Act quickly to protect your life". The first storm resulted in a 3.42 ft (1.04 m) rise along the Short Creek, as measured by a stream gauge in Colorado City, Arizona, in 19 minutes around 21:18 UTC (3:18 p.m. MDT), with residents gathering nearby to observe. Between 22:48 and 23:05 UTC (4:48 and 5:05 p.m. MDT), a second surge of water swept down the creek with the Colorado City gauge reporting a rise of 5.36 ft (1.63 m); the gauge stopped reporting at 23:47 UTC (5:47 p.m. MDT). The second flood swept away two vehicles carrying a collective 16 people while they were observing the rising waters. Thirteen people were killed and three children were rescued. Six bodies were recovered in Utah and two in Arizona, 2.5 mi (4.0 km) downstream. Other bodies were found up to 7 mi (11 km) downstream.

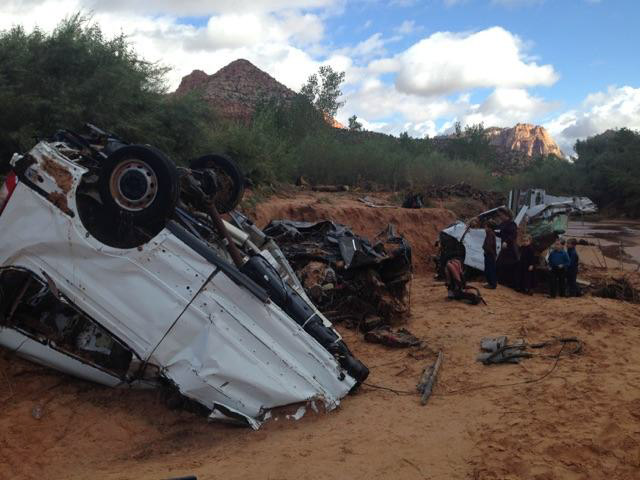
The remains of one of the vehicles swept away in the Hildale flash flood. Of the van's eleven occupants, only one survived.

Alongside the fatalities, the floods left several blocks of the town without power. Water lines, bridges, and other infrastructure sustained varying degrees of damage. Several homes sustained water and mud damage. Total losses in Washington County reached $750,000. Flooding continued downstream into Arizona, rendering multiple roads impassible and damaging bridges around Colorado City; losses in the city amounted to $500,000. Around 150 federal personnel and 500 community volunteers, including 70–80 percent of Hildale's residents, conducted search and rescue in the immediate aftermath. Twenty-four members of Utah Task Force One and twenty-six personnel from the Utah National Guard were dispatched to Hildale to assist in search and rescue along Short Creek. Dangerous conditions along the creek slowed the operation. By September 17, 300 personnel were searching for a 6-year-old boy who was still missing. Ultimately, thousands of people from more than 60 agencies took part in the search for the final victim; efforts were called off by September 29 and the missing boy was presumed dead. Local residents continued periodic searches for the boy through December. The Utah Department of Public Safety granted the Public Safety Award to Washington County Sheriff Cory Pulsipher, Hildale Mayor Philip Barlow and, Hildale Marshall's Office Chief Jeremiah Darger for their response coordination. Following the floods, the Washington County allocated $1.6 million through the Natural Resources Conservation Service for repair costs and mitigation efforts for future floods. Of this total, $1.5 million went to Hildale. The United States Department of Agriculture also provided $100,000 through the Emergency Watershed Protection program.

The second flash flood incident occurred in Keyhole Canyon at Zion National Park after 0.63 in (16 mm) of rain fell between 22:30 and 23:30 UTC (4:30 and 5:30 p.m. MDT). For the two-day period ending September 14, the park saw 1.89 in (48 mm) of rain. The earlier flash flood warning prompted officials at the park to close all canyons by 21:30 UTC (3:30 p.m. MDT). A group of seven canyoneers entered Keyhole Canyon between 21:30 and 22:30 UTC (3:30 and 4:30 p.m. MDT). Flow along the Virgin River dramatically increased following the rains, with the river's North Fork experiencing a rise from 55 ft^{3} (1.5 m^{3}) per second to 2,630 ft^{3} (74.5 m^{3}) per second in just 15 minutes. All seven people were swept away by the ensuing flood and died. Rescue operations were launched that evening; however, dangerous conditions in the canyons resulted in the search being held off until the following day. The bodies of the canyoneers were discovered miles apart along Clear Creek and Pine Creek.

Elsewhere, a man from Hurricane, Utah, 15 mi (24 km) west of Hildale, died on September 14 after being swept away by floods while traveling remote dirt roads. His vehicle was discovered in Mohave County, Arizona on September 17 about 7 mi (11 km) south of the Arizona–Utah border and his body was found a further 6 mi (9.7 km) away the following day. In Utah County, Utah, the rain resulted in traffic accidents and mudslides, including several at American Fork Canyon that shut down parts of State Route 92 and State Route 144. Scattered thunderstorms caused sporadic damage across Arizona, leaving $206,000 in losses.

== See also ==
- Weather of 2015
- Tropical cyclones in 2015
- List of Category 3 Pacific hurricanes
- 1939 California tropical storm
- Hurricane Kathleen (1976)
- Hurricane Ismael (1983)
- Tropical Storm Octave (1983)
- Hurricane Nora (1997)
- Hurricane Dolores (2015)
- Hurricane Marie (2026)
