= Hurricane Kathleen =

Category 1 Pacific hurricane in 1976

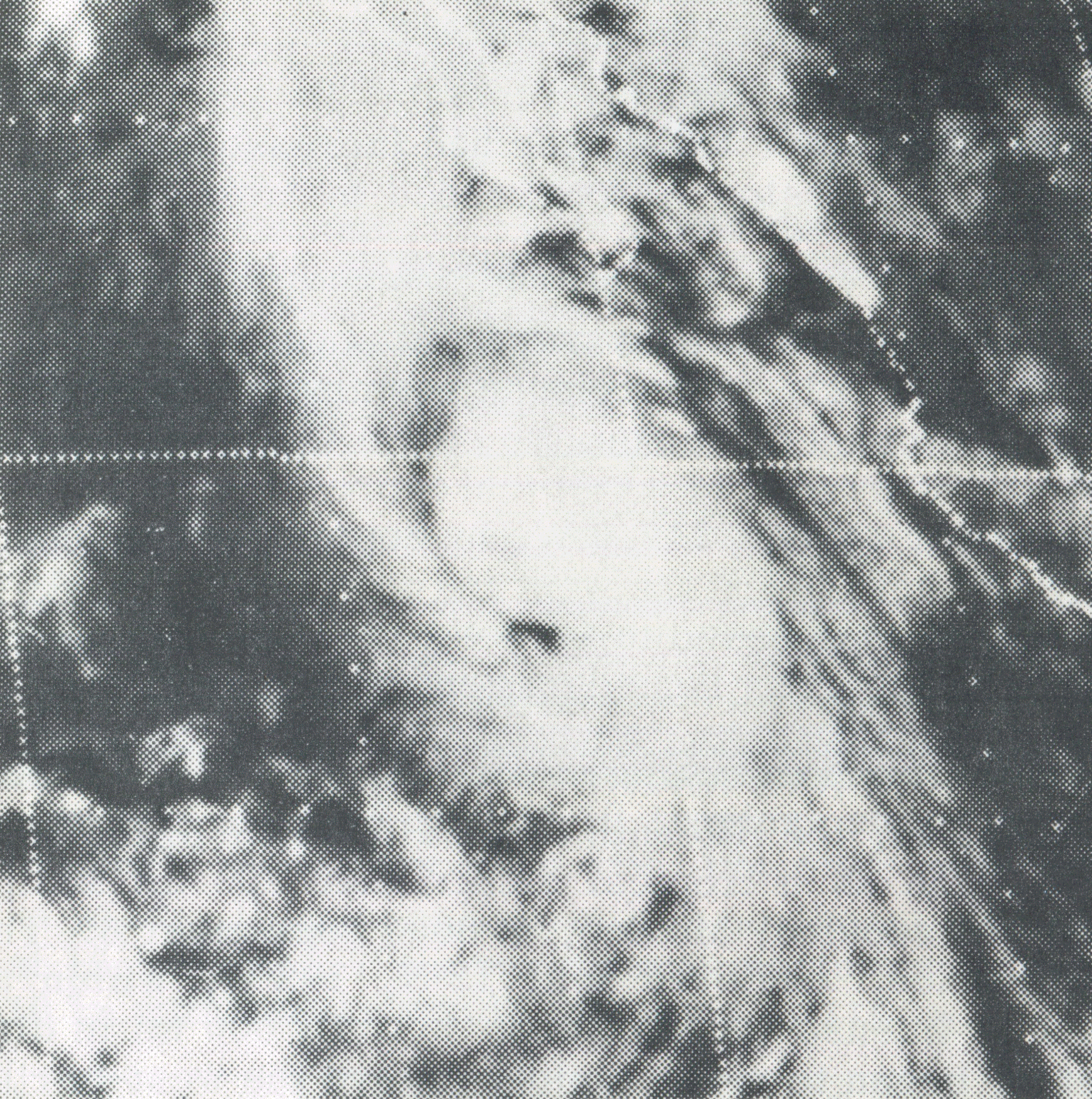
- This weather satellite image of Tropical Storm Kathleen was taken on September 9, 1976 at 0415 UTC

Meteorological history
- Formed: September 7, 1976
- Dissipated: September 11, 1976

Category 1 hurricane
- 1-minute sustained (SSHWS/NWS)
- Highest winds: 80 mph (130 km/h)
- Lowest pressure: 986 mbar (hPa); 29.12 inHg

Overall effects
- Fatalities: 10 direct, 2 indirect
- Damage: $160 million (1976 USD)
- Areas affected: Baja California Peninsula, Southern California, Arizona, Nevada
- IBTrACS
- Part of the 1976 Pacific hurricane season

Hurricane Kathleen was a Category 1 Pacific hurricane that had a destructive impact in California. On September 7, 1976, a tropical depression formed; two days later it accelerated north towards the Baja California Peninsula. Kathleen brushed the Pacific coast of the peninsula as a hurricane on September 9 and made landfall as a fast-moving tropical storm the next day. With its circulation intact and still a tropical storm, Kathleen headed north into the United States and affected California and Arizona. Kathleen finally dissipated late on September 11.

Damage in the United States was considerable. California received record rainfall, with over a foot of rain falling in some areas. Flooding caused catastrophic destruction to Ocotillo, and six people drowned. Flooding extended west; railway tracks were destroyed in Palm Desert and high winds and severe flooding were recorded in Arizona. Overall, the damage total was $160 million (1976 USD, about $760 million in 2023) and 12 deaths were attributed to the storm.

== Background ==
Tropical cyclones do not typically bring high winds to the southwestern United States. Most Pacific hurricanes are embedded in easterly winds south of the subtropical ridge, and thus move westward—away from large land masses—until they dissipate over cold waters. However, during early autumn, tropical cyclones generally form closer to the Mexican shoreline than average, making them more likely to recurve, or to curve again, northward under the influence of an approaching trough. These troughs tend to extend farther to the south during the latter part of the Pacific hurricane season, in the period between late August and early October. They also produce a synoptic-scale flow that is conducive to steering hurricanes towards the southwestern United States. However, many hurricanes that approach the southwestern United States tend to be undergoing extratropical transition as they encounter increased wind shear and markedly cooler sea surface temperatures, and as they interact with the deep troughs that caused them to recurve. Kathleen is one of only six recorded tropical cyclones in the eastern Pacific Ocean known to have brought gale-force or hurricane-force winds to the Continental United States.

== Meteorological history ==
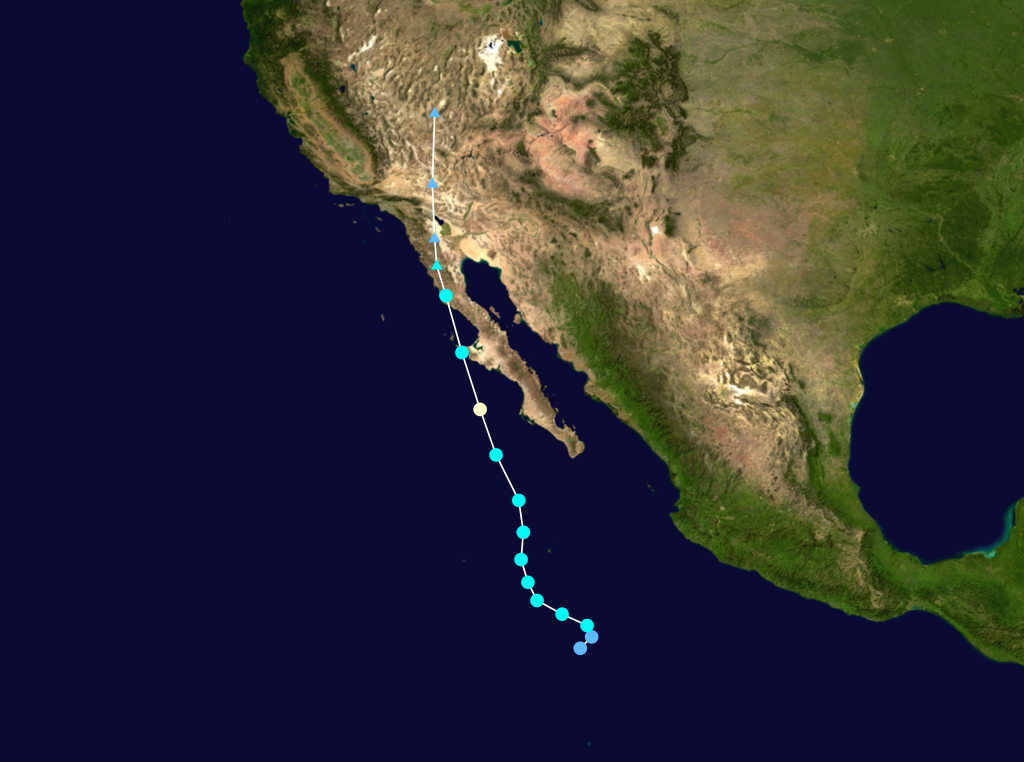
Map plotting the storm's track and intensity, according to the Saffir–Simpson scale Map key Saffir–Simpson scale Tropical depression (≤38 mph, ≤62 km/h) Tropical storm (39–73 mph, 63–118 km/h) Category 1 (74–95 mph, 119–153 km/h) Category 2 (96–110 mph, 154–177 km/h) Category 3 (111–129 mph, 178–208 km/h) Category 4 (130–156 mph, 209–251 km/h) Category 5 (≥157 mph, ≥252 km/h) Unknown Storm type Tropical cyclone Subtropical cyclone Extratropical cyclone, remnant low, tropical disturbance, or monsoon depression

A large area of thunderstorms, with a diameter of about 500 mi (800 km), formed 270 mi (430 km) southwest of Acapulco. Moving rapidly west-northwest, a tropical depression formed on September 7. While briefly moving towards the east, the depression intensified into Tropical Storm Kathleen. Moving above 83 °F (28 °C) sea surface temperatures, Kathleen quickly strengthened. Before passing 40 mi (64 km) east of Socorro Island, Kathleen reached its secondary peak with winds of 65 mph (115 km/h). Kathleen then weakened considerably, and by 0600 UTC September 9, Tropical Storm Kathleen was barely a tropical storm. At this time, the system was located at 55 mi (89 km) north of the island. Shortly thereafter, Kathleen turned north-northeast into warmer waters.

Subsequently, the tropical storm began to re-strengthen. Despite moving rapidly north, the cyclone strengthened into Hurricane Kathleen. The hurricane passed near several ships, and was intercepted by a Hurricane Hunter aircraft early on September 10. It is estimated that the storm peaked in intensity around that time, with winds of 80 mph (130 km/h) and a barometric pressure of 986 mb (986 hPa). However, Kathleen never developed an eye. About an hour after the first flight reached Kathleen, a second flight suggested that Kathleen had weakened back into a tropical storm. With precipitation falling in the United States, some 700 mi (1,100 km) north of the cyclone's atmospheric circulation, Kathleen's motion accelerated to speeds of 35 mph (56 km/h)-38 mph (61 km/h).

After crossing the Point Eugenia peninsula (the cyclone's first landfall) later on the morning of September 10, Kathleen made its second landfall 120 mi (190 km) south of Ensenada at 1130 UTC the same day. Unlike most tropical cyclones, Kathleen weakened slowly over California. Tropical Storm Kathleen weakened further into a depression over southern California and shortly thereafter, moved across Death Valley. On September 11, Kathleen entered western Nevada. Finally, the center became difficult to locate, and the depression dissipated later on September 11. After undergoing a Fujiwhara-like interaction, where two circulations interact with each other, with a low-pressure area stalled off the Pacific coast, moisture later spread into the northwestern part of the United States. After the stalled low was pulled inland, Kathleen combined with the low to produce additional rainfall over parts of California.

== Impact ==
=== Mexico ===
The bulk of the rainfall from the tropical cyclone fell over Baja California and Baja California Sur, to the east of its track. The highest amount reported was 6.52 in (166 mm) in San Antonio.

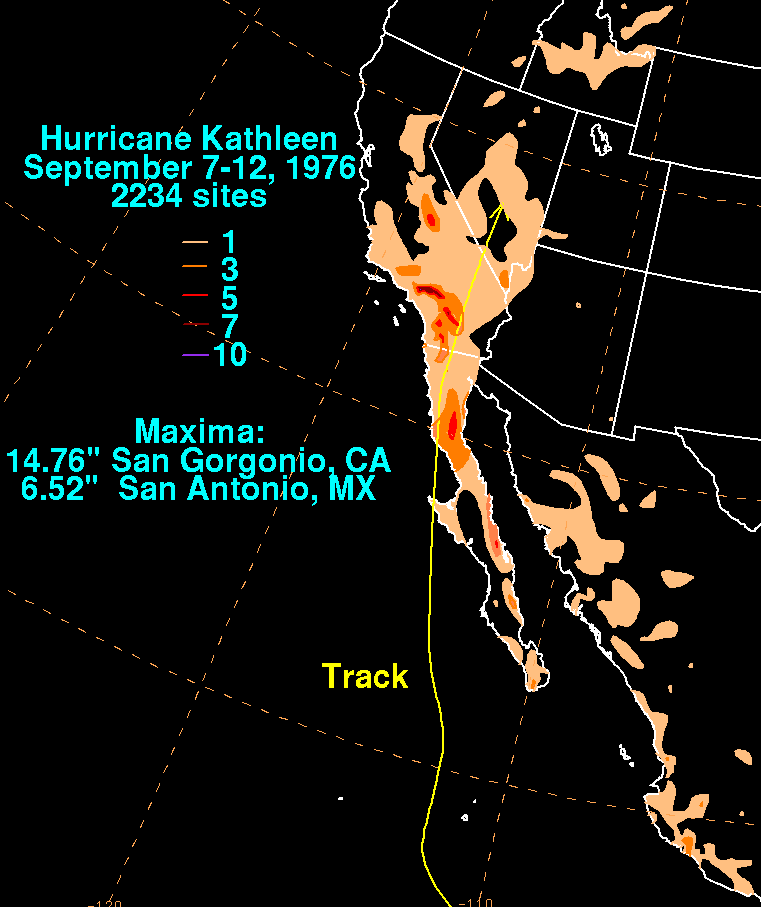
Kathleen's rainfall

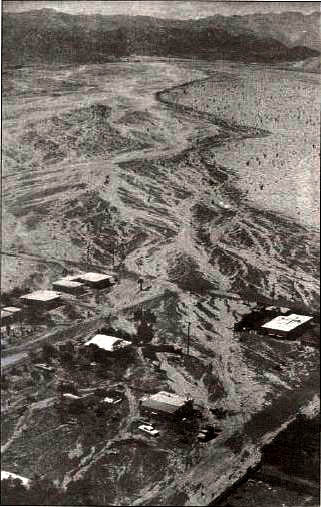
Aerial photo of damage in Ocotillo, California

=== California ===
The state received record rainfall, with 14.76 in (37.5 cm) falling on the southern slopes of Mount San Gorgonio, and 10.13 in (25.7 cm) accumulated on Mount Laguna. Because the village is situated atop an alluvial fan, a 40 ft (12 m) wall of water exited a mountain canyon. Ocotillo was flooded with 4 ft (1.2 m)-6 ft (1.8 m) of water; subsequently, half the town was destroyed. Six people drowned in the mud and waters in the town and two people were initially reported missing, though they were later found by officials. Overall, Ocotllio was 70%–80% destroyed. Officials evacuated 175 people from the flooded area of Ocotillo and the nearby communities that surround the Salton Sea; the sea rose 6 in (150 mm)-8 in (200 mm). A quarter mile of Interstate 8 and a 60-foot bridge were destroyed by the flood, which also washed away mobile homes, trucks, and cars.

In Los Angeles, two people died of injuries suffered from slippery roads. One man drowned in El Centro. and two people drowned when their cars tumbled into the water near the city. Record flood stage was attained at numerous streams near the Coachella Valley. Widespread property damage was recorded on the eastern slopes of the Sierra Nevada as well as the nearby desert. Across the San Joaquin Valley, 2/3 of the $150 million raisin crop was threatened. Crops including cotton, lettuce, and hay were damaged. About half of the lettuce in the Palo Verde Valley were lost.

Homeowners in Palm Desert suffered $4 million in damage from the storm; the town received more than a year's worth of rainfall in a matter of days. No serious injuries were reported throughout the desert city, though two agricultural dikes broke.

Several miles of railway track, including three trestles that belonged to the San Diego and Arizona Eastern Railway, were destroyed and five others were damaged. At more than 50 other locations, tracks were buried by mudslides or had the ground under them washed away. After assessing the damage from Kathleen, the Southern Pacific Transportation Company decided in 1977 to abandon most of the railroad. The United States Gypsum narrow gauge railroad line from Plaster City and the Santa Fe Railway line from Rice to Blythe also had tracks damaged, and a Santa Fe freight train was stranded and quickly rescued. A 700 ft (210 m) section of Interstate 8 from Yuma to San Diego was destroyed.

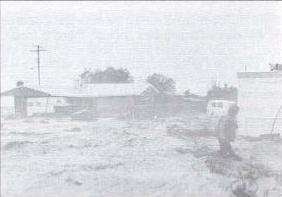
Floodwaters caused by the storm

Overall, hundreds of homes were damaged or destroyed; Tropical Storm Kathleen was described as a one-in- 160-year event. Total damage was $160 million, making Kathleen one of the costliest tropical storms in state history. Parts of California were declared a disaster area, and flash flood watches were issued throughout Southern California, including the desert and mountains. Flash flood warnings were also issued for parts of California, as well as nearby states Nevada and Arizona, but were dropped as the rain tampered off on September 11.

=== Arizona ===
On September 10–11, gale-force winds caused considerable damage to the city of Yuma. For a time, the sustained winds exceeded 50 mph (80 km/h), with gusts up to 76 mph (122 km/h). The National Weather Service's forecast office in Tucson estimates that tropical storm-force winds extended as far east as Pima County, and as far north as Lake Havasu. Rains caused severe flash-flooding in Mohave County. One man was killed when the wind blew a palm tree onto his mobile home and 13 people across the state were hurt. The Tucson metropolitan area was particularly hard hit with flash flooding and golf-ball size hail. On Mount Lemmon, the hail reached a depth of 5 in (13 cm). While most of the rainfall from Tropical Storm Kathleen fell in California, 2.87 in (73 mm) fell at the Davis Dam on the Colorado River.

=== Rest of the United States ===
In Montana, Kathleen dropped locally heavy rainfall approaching 2 inches (51 mm) in localized spots, enough to become the wettest known tropical cyclone in state history, which was later broken in 2023 by Hurricane Hilary. The remnants of the storm also affected Oregon and Idaho.

== See also ==
- List of California hurricanes
- List of Arizona hurricanes
- List of wettest tropical cyclones in California
- Hurricane Nora (1997) – Took a similar track to Kathleen, brought heavy rains to Arizona and California.
- Hurricane Dolores (2015) – Brought record breaking heavy rains to Southern California, as a remnant low, during one of the worst dry periods on record.
- Hurricane Linda (2015) – Brought a record heavy rain to Southern California in September.
- Hurricane Kay (2022) – Caused similar impacts to California as a downgraded tropical storm and remnant low.
- Hurricane Hilary (2023) – Took a similar track and struck Baja California as a tropical storm.
