= 1929 Pacific hurricane season =

Seasonal boundaries
- First system formed: March 20, 1929
- Last system dissipated: September 23, 1929

Strongest storm
- Name: Seven
  - Lowest pressure: 957 mbar (hPa; 28.26 inHg)

Seasonal statistics
- Total storms: 9
- Hurricanes: 3
- Total fatalities: Unknown
- Total damage: Unknown

Related articles
- 1929 Atlantic hurricane season; 1929 Pacific typhoon season; 1920s North Indian Ocean cyclone seasons

The 1929 Pacific hurricane season ran through the summer and fall of 1929. Before the satellite age started in the 1960s, data on east Pacific hurricanes was extremely unreliable. Most east Pacific storms were of no threat to land.

== Systems ==
=== Hurricane One ===
A "tropical hurricane" made a clockwise loop near Johnston Island between March 20 and 24.

=== Tropical Cyclone Two ===
A tropical cyclone existed from May 29 to June 1. Starting from a location southwest of the Gulf of Tehuantepec, it traveled west-northwestward not far off the Mexican shore. A ship recorded its lowest known pressure of 29.21 inHg (98.9 kPa).

=== Tropical Cyclone Three ===
A cyclone existed southwest of Acapulco on June 16 and 17. It produced gales, and a ship reported a pressure reading of 29.66 inHg (100.4 kPa).

=== Hurricane Four ===
On August 2, a tropical cyclone formed near the Mexican coast. It eventually became a hurricane, and was last seen on August 6. The lowest pressure reported in association with this system was 28.80 inHg (97.5 kPa).

=== Possible Tropical Cyclone Five ===
On August 21 and 22, a ship encountered a possible tropical cyclone at a location far from land and almost in the central Pacific basin. The lowest pressure reported by a ship was 29.42 inHg (99.6 kPa).

=== Tropical Cyclone Six ===
On August 28, this cyclone moved along the coast, and passed over the southern tip of the Baja California Peninsula around August 31.

=== Hurricane Seven ===
On September 10, a tropical cyclone formed in the Gulf of Tehuantepec. It moved along the coast, and was a hurricane by September 13. It moved along the Pacific side of the Baja California Peninsula, and became a remnant off its northern coast on September 16. Its remnants subsequently moved inland, and dissipated around September 18. The lowest pressure measured in association with this tropical cyclone was 28.28 inHg (95.8 kPa).

This tropical cyclone inflicted gale or hurricane-force winds along parts of the coast of Mexico, including Manzanillo, Acapulco, and Mazatlán. On September 18, its remnants caused rain of up to 4 inches (100 mm) in mountainous parts of Southern California. An unseasonal warming was also attributed to this cyclone. It was also responsible for the strongest September winds ever recorded in San Diego up to that time.

Somewhere between Manzanillo and Acapulco, a tropical cyclone might have existed on September 19.

=== Tropical Cyclone Nine ===
On September 23, a tropical cyclone was located southeast of the Gulf of Tehuantepec. It was last observed the next day. A ship reported a pressure of 29.56 inHg (100.1 kPa).

=== Other systems ===
In March 20 until March 22, there is a cyclone of "near tropical in nature" west of Hawaiian Islands, and with pressures as low as 29.18 inHg (98.8 kPa). It is unknown whether that cyclone is a tropical cyclone or subtropical cyclone.

== See also ==
- 1929 Atlantic hurricane season
- 1929 Pacific typhoon season
- 1920s North Indian Ocean cyclone seasons
- 1900–1940 South Pacific cyclone seasons
- 1900–1950 South-West Indian Ocean cyclone seasons
- 1920s Australian region cyclone seasons
