= 1920–1924 Pacific hurricane seasons =

The 1920-24 Pacific hurricane seasons all began on May 15 of their respective years in the eastern north Pacific Ocean and on June 1 in the central north Pacific. They ended on November 30, of each year. These dates conventionally delimit the time of year when most tropical cyclones form in northeast Pacific Ocean tropical cyclone basin, between the International Date Line and the west coast of North America. However, tropical cyclone formation is possible at any time of the year. Before the dawn of the satellite era in the 1960s, data on Pacific hurricanes is extremely unreliable. For a few years, there are no reported cyclones, although many systems likely formed and went undocumented.

== 1920 ==
Three known tropical cyclones formed this year in the eastern Pacific proper. One of them existed from September 10 to 13. It passed close to the southern tip of the Baja California Peninsula but never made landfall.

== 1921 ==
Nine tropical cyclones are known this year in the eastern Pacific proper.

I. After crossing central Baja California, a tropical cyclone moved northward into southwestern Arizona on August 20, causing up to 2 inches (51 mm) of rain.

II. A system stayed at sea from September 25 to 30. It paralleled the coast of Mexico without making landfall. The remnants of this tropical cyclone moved northeastward through Baja California and Arizona, producing up to 4 inches (100 mm) of rain in the desert region.

III. and IV. Two possible tropical cyclones exited in the central Pacific during the month of October. The first developed on October 5 near Hawaii, and moved northward until being absorbed by an extratropical storm over the Aleutian Islands. The second was observed on October 17 well to the northeast of Hawaii. For both of these systems, it is unknown what, if any, tropical characteristics they had. It is possible they were Kona-type storms due to their locations.

== 1922 ==
Seven tropical cyclones formed this year.

I. One of them was an extremely unusual hurricane that formed between February 6 and 18 and hassled a ship moving between San Pedro and Panama City. This is the only Eastern Pacific hurricane to form in the month of February.

II. Another cyclone paralleled the coast of Mexico from August 27 to 30. It passed south of the Revilla Gigedo Islands but otherwise stayed at sea.

III. A "tropical hurricane" formed offshore western Mexico on September 9, and moved northwest, parallel but well offshore the coast, dissipating on September 13.

IV. A tropical cyclone was tracked from October 14 to 16. It moved northeast and made landfall near Mazatlán.

== 1923 ==
Five known tropical cyclones existed in the eastern Pacific proper this year.

I. The initial low pressure area formed on August 20 well southwest of Hawaii. Moving generally westward, it was a small hurricane on August 23 when it was last noted. This storm is known as the Vega Cyclone, named after the USS Vega (AK-17) which reported the storm.

II. A tropical storm formed on October 12. After moving north, it made landfall near Salina Cruz. It crossed the Isthmus of Tehuantepec and emerged into the Bay of Campeche. It strengthened into Atlantic hurricane 6 and eventually made landfall in Louisiana as a weak Category 2.

== 1924 ==
Three known tropical cyclones formed this year in the eastern Pacific proper.

I. One was detected on September 2. It stayed at sea and was lost track of on September 8.

II. Another system was discovered on September 6. It moved in a generally northerly direction. It dissipated on September 9 after making landfall about midway between Acapulco and a place called "C. Corrigules". However, weather associated with it crossed into the Gulf of Mexico.

== See also ==
- Pacific hurricane
- 1920–1938 Pacific typhoon seasons
- 1920s North Indian Ocean cyclone seasons
- 1900–1940 South Pacific cyclone seasons
- 1900–1950 South-West Indian Ocean cyclone seasons
- 1920s Australian region cyclone seasons
