= 1858 San Diego hurricane =

Category 1 Pacific hurricane in 1858

1858 San Diego Hurricane
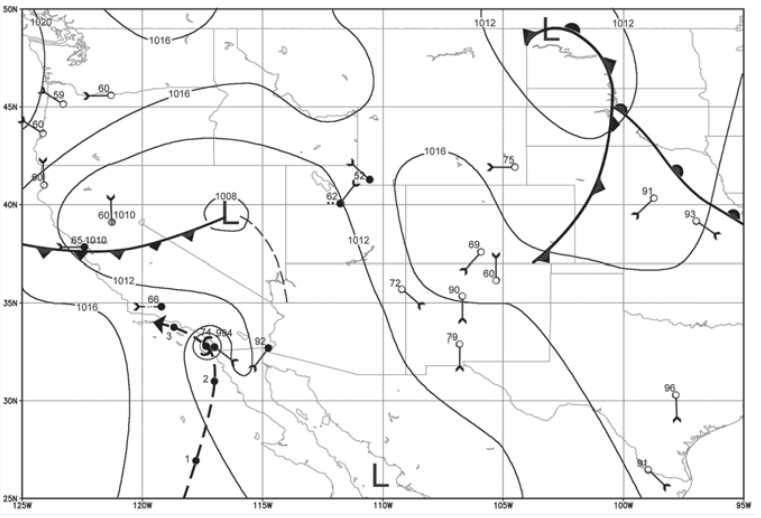
- Surface weather analysis and track of the storm approaching California

Meteorological history
- Formed: September 1858
- Dissipated: October 2, 1858

Category 1 hurricane
- 1-minute sustained (SSHWS/NWS)
- Highest winds: 80 mph (130 km/h)
- Lowest pressure: 994 mbar (hPa); 29.35 inHg (corrected sea level)

Overall effects
- Casualties: Unknown
- Fatalities: Unknown
- Injuries: Unknown
- Damage: $100.00 (1858 USD)
- Areas affected: Southern California, northwestern Mexico
- Part of the pre-1900 Pacific hurricane seasons

The 1858 San Diego hurricane was a very rare hurricane that impacted Southern California. It is the only known tropical cyclone to directly impact California as a hurricane, although other systems have impacted California as tropical storms. The storm caused considerable damage to many homes and other structures in Southern California, mainly around San Diego. A later estimate indicated that if a similar storm happened in 2004, it would have caused $500 million (2004 USD) in damage.

== Meteorological history ==
In late September 1858, a hurricane formed over the eastern Pacific Ocean, concurrent with a moderate El Niño event spanning 1857–58. Unlike most east Pacific storms, this one accelerated toward the north-northeast. On October 2, it neared Southern California while weakening, due to cool sea surface temperatures and strong wind shear. The hurricane just missed making landfall, while turning to the west-northwest. The storm approached Santa Catalina Island in the Channel Islands and dissipated later on that day. There is some uncertainty to this reconstructed path.

== Impact ==
In San Diego, heavy rain fell, and property damage was significant; many homes lost their roofs, and a few even collapsed. In addition, trees were uprooted, and fences destroyed. Strong winds blew through the city for much of the day of October 2, with rain following after. A recently constructed windmill was also blown away completely, and the lighthouse keeper at Point Loma fled the lighthouse, fearing it would collapse in the gale. Three schooners, the Plutus, the Lovely Flora, and the X.L., were blown ashore, although only the X.L. suffered major damage.

Rainfall in San Pedro was also heavy, but high winds were not reported. Parts of the embankment in the city were washed away, causing only around US$100 ($3,100.02 in 2019) in damage. The yacht Medora was washed ashore. Many reports claimed that the yacht was irreparable, but it was later claimed that the damage was not serious and could be repaired. A barge was destroyed, as was a large portion of the San Pedro wharf.

El Monte was buffeted by high winds, damaging corn crops and trees. Los Angeles and Visalia noted large amounts of rain, as much as 7 inches (180 mm), but wind strength as low.

Two researchers with NOAA, Michael Chenoweth and Christopher Landsea reconstructed the path of the hurricane using accounts from newspapers of the strong winds. They estimated that if a similar storm were to have hit in 2004, it would have caused around US$500 million in damage.

=== Records ===
The hurricane was the only hurricane in recorded history known to impact California. Due to the cold water California Current tropical cyclones typically weaken, diminishing the storms' strength below the tropical storm level.

== See also ==
- List of Pacific hurricanes
- List of California hurricanes
- 1939 California tropical storm – made landfall in California as a tropical storm.
- Hurricane Hilary (2023) – impacted California as a tropical storm after making landfall in Baja California.
