= 1939 California tropical storm =

Category 1 Pacific hurricane in 1939

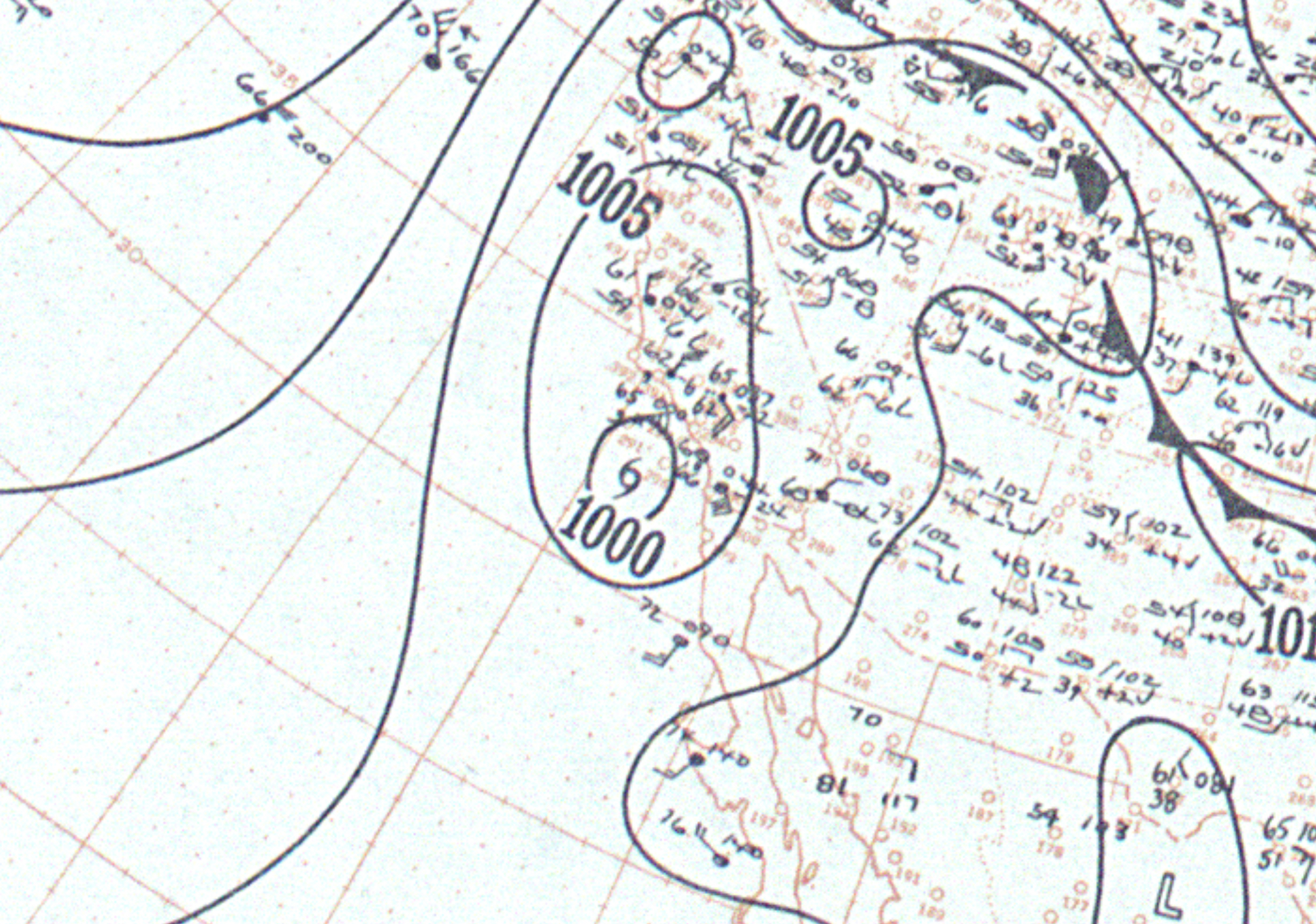
- Synoptic weather map of the tropical storm nearing landfall in Southern California on September 25, 1939

Meteorological history
- Formed: September 15, 1939
- Dissipated: September 25, 1939

Category 1 hurricane
- 1-minute sustained (SSHWS/NWS)
- Highest winds: 75 mph (120 km/h)
- Lowest pressure: 971 mbar (hPa); 28.67 inHg

Overall effects
- Fatalities: 45–93 direct
- Damage: $2 million (1939 USD)
- Areas affected: Southern California, northwestern Mexico
- Part of the 1939 Pacific hurricane season

The 1939 California tropical storm, also known as the 1939 Long Beach tropical storm, and El Cordonazo (referring to the Cordonazo winds or the "Lash of St. Francis" (Spanish: el cordonazo de San Francisco)), was a tropical cyclone that affected Southern California in September 1939. Forming on September 15, the cyclone intensified into a hurricane, but weakened to a tropical storm before making landfall near the San Pedro neighborhood of Los Angeles, California, on September 25. It was the first tropical cyclone to directly affect California since the 1858 San Diego hurricane, and is the only tropical cyclone of tropical-storm strength (or greater) to make landfall in the U.S. state of California.

The storm brought heavy flooding due to record-breaking rainfall, including a total of 11.6 in (290 mm) of precipitation on Mount Wilson and amounts in excess of 4 in (100 mm) at several locations in Greater Los Angeles. In addition to inundating roads and damaging buildings, the floods caused 45 deaths. Along the coast and offshore, rough seas capsized or beached a number of vessels while also drowning 48 people. Winds also led to thousands of power outages and losses of telephone service. Overall, the storm caused approximately $2 million in damage (1939 USD). (Note: All damage figures are in 1939 USD, unless otherwise noted)

== Meteorological history ==
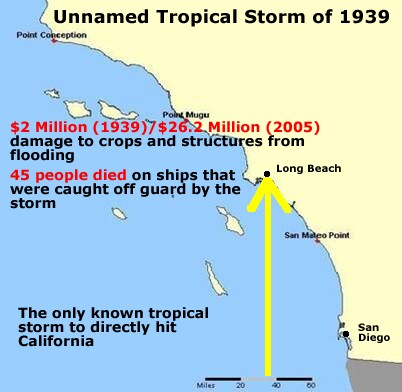
Map of the tropical storm's path

On September 15, a tropical depression formed over the Eastern Pacific Ocean around 10°N 91°W, according to Weather Bureau (the predecessor to the National Weather Service) meteorologist Willis E. Hurd, which is approximately 260 mi (420 km) southwest of El Salvador. It moved west-northwestward, passing southwest of the Revillagigedo Islands. It then turned north and later northeastward. For some time, the cyclone maintained hurricane status but lost that intensity on or just before September 25. Although several ships recorded force 7 conditions on the Beaufort scale between September 15 and September 19, the steamer Ewa observed force 11 conditions on September 22 and an atmospheric pressure pressure of 971 mbar (28.7 inHg), the lowest known pressure in association with this cyclone. Thus, this system intensified into a minimal hurricane.

As it continued northward, the cyclone weakened to a tropical storm prior to making landfall near the San Pedro neighborhood of Los Angeles, California, early on September 25, with sustained winds of 50 mph (80 km/h). Several ships offshore Southern California observed force 8 to 9 conditions. According to Hurd, the storm dissipated later that day, while the Los Angeles–Oxnard office of the National Weather Service noted that the system "likely dissipated within a day or two."

Due to the rotation of the Earth, tropical cyclones in the Northern Hemisphere tend to move from east to west. This causes tropical cyclones to approach the West Coast of the United States infrequently. Another inhibiting factor for a California landfall is the surrounding water temperatures. Because of the water currents, the waters off the coast of California are rarely above 70 °F (21 °C), which is too cold for hurricanes to sustain themselves. This tropical cyclone, also known as the Long Beach tropical storm or El Cordonazo, was rare enough that only three other eastern Pacific tropical cyclones brought tropical storm-force winds to the Continental United States during the twentieth century, while it was the only one to make landfall; the other three hit Mexico before moving north but did not make landfall in California.

== Preparations and impact ==
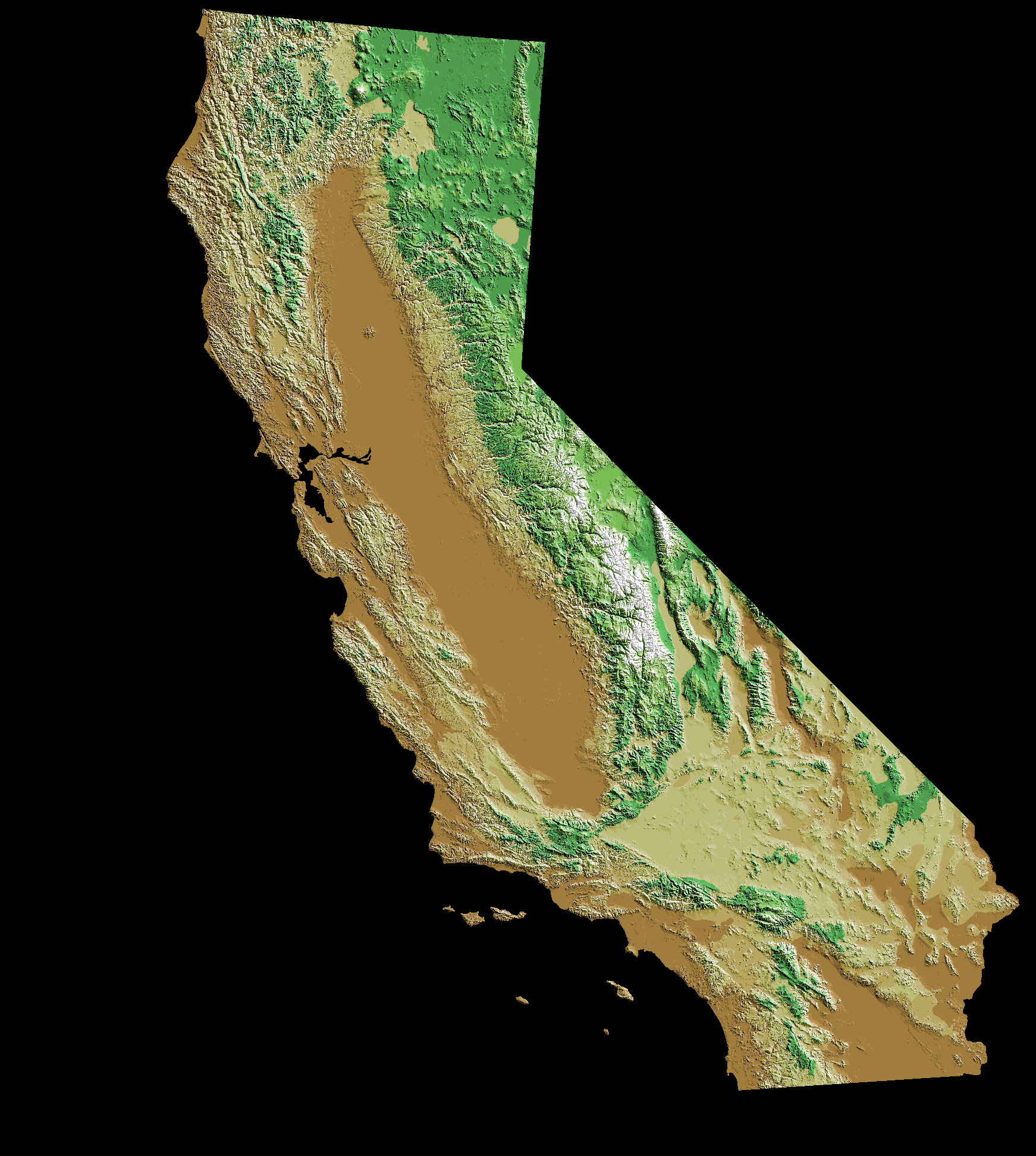
Map of California

The storm dropped heavy rain in California, with 5.66 in (144 mm) falling in Los Angeles (5.24 in or 133 mm in 24 hours) and 11.60 in (295 mm) recorded at Mount Wilson, both September records. Over three hours, one thunderstorm dropped nearly 7 in (180 mm) of rain on Indio. 9.65 in (245 mm) fell on Raywood Flat. Pasadena observed at least 4.82 in (122 mm) of precipitation, respectively. At the time, the former represented the record for the heaviest amount of precipitation during the entire month of September in Pasadena, with observations beginning in 1882. Other locations reporting at least 4 in (100 mm) of rain included the Citrus Belt near Anaheim, Claremont, Fullerton, and Lytle Creek. The 11.60 in (295 mm) at Mount Wilson is one of California's highest rainfall amounts from a tropical cyclone, although at least one system has a higher point maximum. The rains caused a flood 2 to 4 ft (0.6 to 1.2 m) deep in the Coachella Valley with heavy rain immediately preceding the tropical storm dropping 6.45 in (164 mm) the day before the storm hit. The Los Angeles River, which was usually low during September, became a raging torrent.

With heavy rain immediately preceding the tropical storm, flooding killed 45 in Southern California. Six people died as a result of storm-related traffic accidents in Los Angeles. While United Press International reported on September 27 that as many as 100 people may have been lost at sea due to 35 yachts being missing at the time, the maritime death toll was later placed at 48. However, the National Hurricane Center only attributes 45 deaths to this system. Six people caught on beaches drowned during the storm. Most other deaths were at sea. Twenty-four died aboard a vessel called the Spray as it attempted to dock at Point Mugu. The two survivors, a man and a woman, swam ashore and then walked 5 mi (8 km) to Oxnard. Fifteen people from Ventura drowned aboard a fishing boat named Lur. Many other vessels were sunk, capsized, or blown ashore. One person also suffered a fatal heart attack after attempting to untangle a yacht propellor. Despite the sudden appearance of the cyclone, 100 yachts safely reached Santa Catalina Island, with some of those vessels occupied by Hollywood celebrities such as Lili Damita, Errol Flynn, Hedy Lamarr, and Lola Lane. Additionally, approximately 200 people were rescued from rough seas on September 24 and September 25.

Approximately 39,500 customers lost telephone service in the Greater Los Angeles area due to the storm. Many low-lying areas were flooded. The Hamilton Bowl overflowed, flooding the Signal Hill area. Along the shore from Malibu to Huntington Beach houses were flooded. Throughout the area, thousands of people were stranded in their homes. Streets in Los Angeles proper were covered with water, flooding buildings and stalling cars. Flooding in Inglewood and Los Angeles reached a depth of 2 to 3 ft (0.61 to 0.91 m). Construction on a flood control project in the Los Angeles River's channel by the Army Corps of Engineers was stopped by the flooding. Along the coast, the Los Angeles Yacht Club experienced about $100,000 in damage due to the storm capsizing five racing sloops and damaging several other vessels. Windows throughout Long Beach were smashed by the wind. At Belmont Shore and the Peninsula, waves undermined ten homes before washing them away. Debris was scattered throughout the coast. Another seven dwellings were undermined at Santa Monica, where the Pacific Coast Highway (then known as Roosevelt Highway) was closed. Several piers were damaged, including at the Balboa Peninsula, Doheny, Huntington Beach, Newport Beach, and Point Mugu. Winds toppled the wall of the main hangar at Orange County's Eddie Martin Airport (now known as the John Wayne Airport), causing its roof to sag.

Farther inland, floodwaters backing up from a storm drain under construction in the San Gabriel Valley blocked California State Route 60. In Pasadena, 5000 people were left without electricity and 2000 telephones lost service. Communications throughout the affected area was disrupted or rendered impossible. Flooding trapped several people at the San Antonio canyon in the vicinity of Camp Baldy. Agriculture was disrupted. Crop damage in the Coachella Valley reached 75%. In particular, The Desert Sun newspaper of Palm Springs reported that "the date growers of the Coachella Valley suffered the most on the desert, the crop being practically wiped out." Rains washed away a 150-foot (46 m) section of the Southern Pacific Railroad near Indio, and a stretch of the Santa Fe main line near Needles. In the former, floodwaters entered several stores, damaging some merchandise, while almost 6 in (150 mm) of water inundated the main street of the city of Coachella. The total amount of damage throughout California was $2 million (1939 USD, $46 million in 2025 USD).

The tropical storm was credited with at least one beneficial effect: it ended a vicious heat wave that had lasted for over a week and killed at least 90 people.

People were caught unprepared by the storm, which was described as "sudden". Some people were still on the beach at Long Beach when the wind reached 40 mph (64 km/h; 35 kn), at which time lifeguards closed the beach. Schools were closed there. At sea, the Coast Guard and Navy conducted rescue operations, saving dozens of people. In response to Californians' unpreparedness, the Weather Bureau established a forecast office for southern California, which began operations in February 1940.

== See also ==
- List of California hurricanes
- List of wettest tropical cyclones in California
