= Hurricane Olivia (1982) =

Category 4 Pacific hurricane in 1982

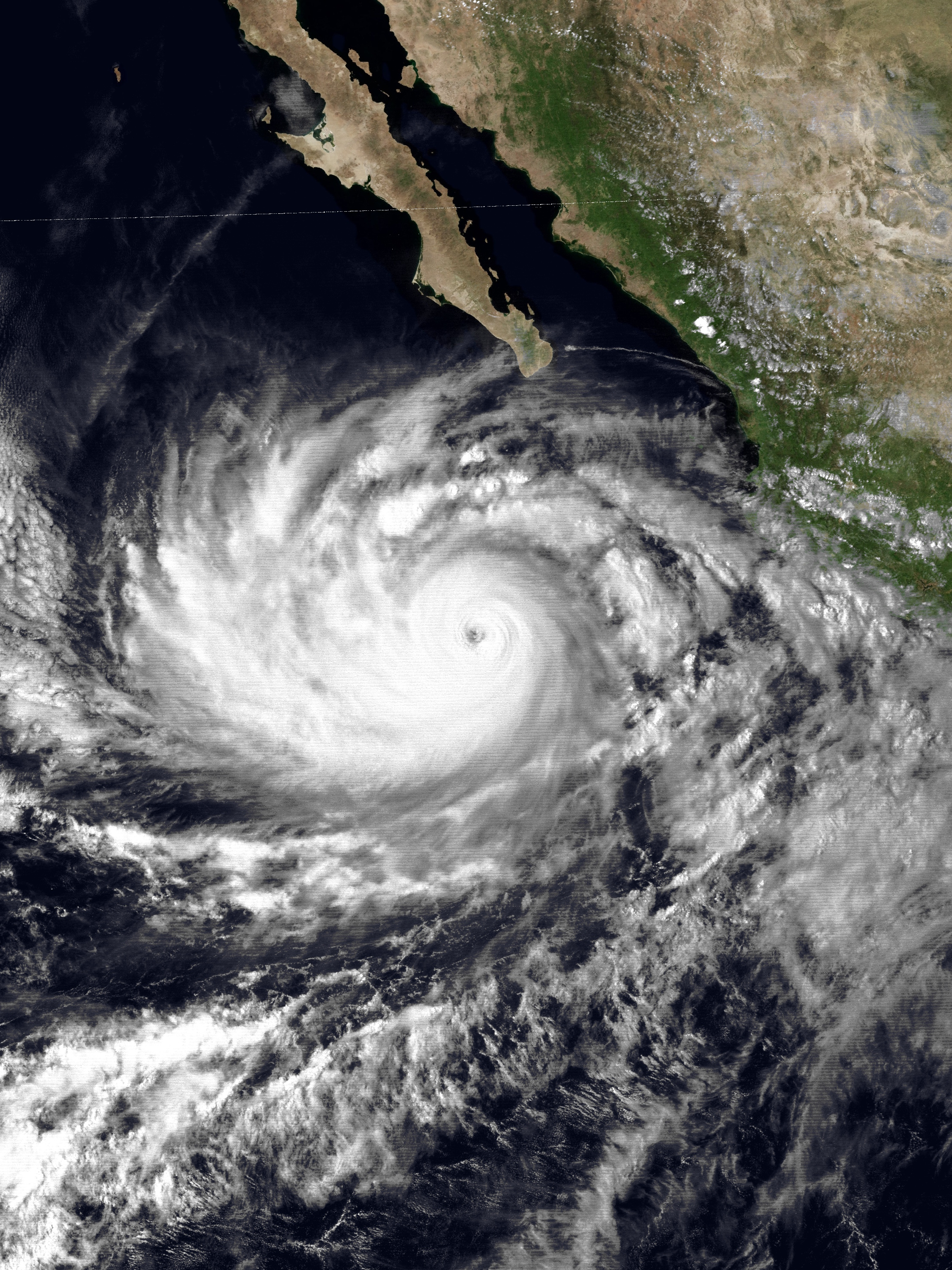
- Olivia at peak intensity on September 21, south of the Baja California peninsula

Meteorological history
- Formed: September 18, 1982
- Dissipated: September 25, 1982

Category 4 major hurricane
- 1-minute sustained (SSHWS/NWS)
- Highest winds: 145 mph (230 km/h)

Overall effects
- Fatalities: 3 indirect
- Damage: ≤ $475 million (1982 USD)
- Areas affected: Revillagigedo Islands, California, Western United States, Southwestern Canada
- Part of the 1982 Pacific hurricane season

Hurricane Olivia was a powerful and destructive Category 4 hurricane, that brought damaging floods to California and Utah during September 1982. Olivia was the twenty-fourth tropical cyclone, eighteenth named storm, ninth hurricane, and fourth major hurricane of the active 1982 Pacific hurricane season. The storm was first noted as a tropical depression from a ship report off the southern coast of Mexico. Olivia then steadily intensified before becoming a Category 4 hurricane, and reaching its peak intensity with 1-minute sustained winds of around 145 mph (230 km/h), at 18:00 UTC on September 21. The hurricane then rapidly weakened as it passed west of mainland Mexico, before being last noted to the west of California on September 25, as a surface trough.

Moisture from Olivia was pulled across the Western United States and Southwestern Canada by a strong southwesterly flow. This resulted in several inches of rainfall, which caused damaging flash flooding and mudslides, namely in Utah. Large amounts of crops were destroyed by the storm in California. Overall, damage from Olivia is estimated to be around $475 million (1982 USD), with 3 fatalities.

== Meteorological history ==
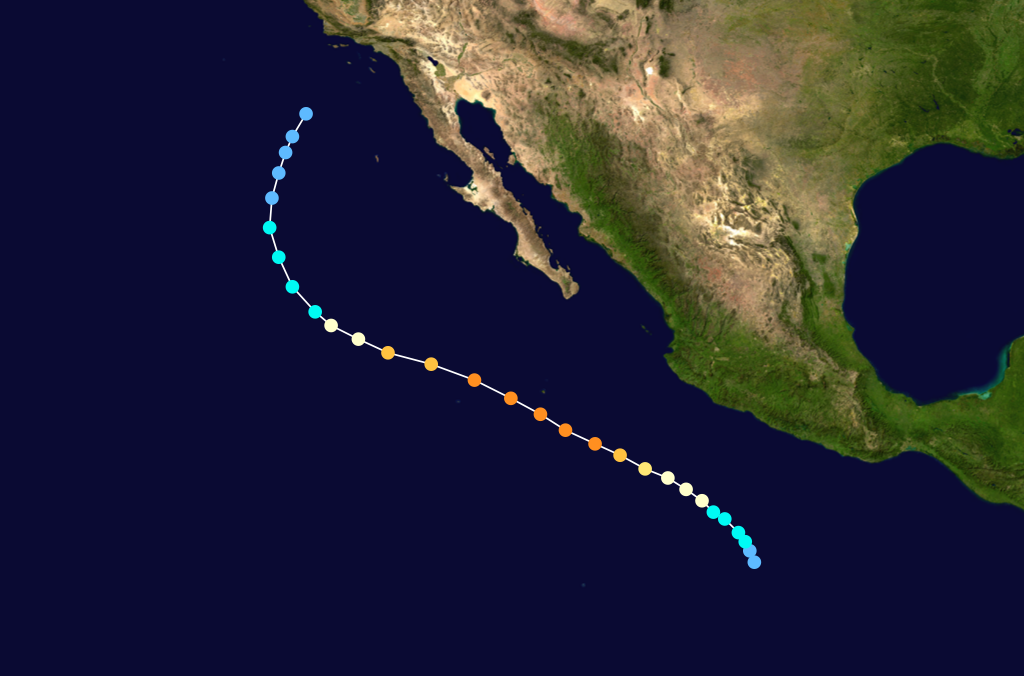
Map plotting the storm's track and intensity, according to the Saffir–Simpson scale Map key Saffir–Simpson scale Tropical depression (≤38 mph, ≤62 km/h) Tropical storm (39–73 mph, 63–118 km/h) Category 1 (74–95 mph, 119–153 km/h) Category 2 (96–110 mph, 154–177 km/h) Category 3 (111–129 mph, 178–208 km/h) Category 4 (130–156 mph, 209–251 km/h) Category 5 (≥157 mph, ≥252 km/h) Unknown Storm type Tropical cyclone Subtropical cyclone Extratropical cyclone, remnant low, tropical disturbance, or monsoon depression

The origins of Hurricane Olivia can be traced back to a weather report from the cargo ship, Port Latta Maru, roughly 400 miles (650 km) south-southwest of Acapulco, Mexico. This reported stated that a tropical cyclone had formed in the area, around 18:00 UTC on September 18. The system moved gradually to the north-northwest while strengthening over warm waters. By 6:00 UTC on September 19, the cyclone was upgraded into a tropical storm, and was provided the name Olivia.

Olivia steadily strengthened while shifting to the northwest, over slightly warmer sea surface temperatures. At 6:00 UTC the next day, Olivia was upgraded into a Category 1 hurricane. Just a few hours later, the hurricane turned to the west-northwest, beneath the southern periphery of an upper-level high located over southern Baja California. Olivia continued to rapidly intensify, reaching its peak intensity as a Category 4 hurricane at 18:00 UTC on September 21, with 1-minute sustained winds of around 145 mph (230 km/h). At this time the storm also presented a well-defined eye. The hurricane then maintained its intensity for about 12 hours, before weakening ensued.

Olivia weakened over the next couple of days, while turning to the north-west along the western periphery of the upper-level high. The system was downgraded into a tropical storm at 18:00 UTC on September 23, while moving over cooler waters. Around this time, moisture from the storm was being carried across the Western United States and Southwestern Canada, by a strong southwesterly flow. This was also largely due to a whip-like effect by an upper-level low pressure area offshore California. Olivia weakened into a tropical depression while located about 500 miles (805 km) southwest of San Diego, California. The system was last noted as a dissipating surface low on September 25, while located roughly 250 miles (400 km) west-southwest of San Diego.

== Preparations, impact, and aftermath ==
=== California ===
A dam burst in the Sierra Madre Mountains, causing 6 inches (152.4 mm) of water to enter into Bishop Creek. Up to 1,400 residents were evacuated from their homes into the nearby town of Bishop. Tourists were trapped along the eastern slope of a mountain in the Sierra Nevada range during the storm. An additional 200 people were stranded at Kings Canyon National Park, after a 15-mile (25 km) stretch of California State Route 180 was washed out. A bridge along U.S. Route 395 in Big Pine was damaged. Lodging and businesses along the highway were evacuated due to floods.

In the Inland Empire, moisture from Olivia caused minimal damage. Numerous utility poles caught fire in the region. Slick roads caused a car accident in Yucaipa, causing one minor injury. In Malibu, stormy weather caused a plane to crash into hills at the Malibu Creek State Park, killing three people. Olivia also caused stormy weather in San Bernardino County. In Calimesa, a telephone pole was struck by lightning. Roughly 1,150 customers of Southern California Edison lost electricity. The power outage affected companies such as Frito-Lay, the KDIG radio station, and a hotel. Power outages also trapped one person in an elevator in Ontario.

Following the floods, California Governor Jerry Brown declared a state of emergency for the Big Pine area. This was done to allow federal loans and other assistance to be provided for the region. Search and rescue workers were able to save 20 campers and residents who were stranded along Big Pine Creek. The flood in Big Pine was found to be caused by a dam collapse. An investigation was opened into the cause of the incident, but no explanation was discovered.

Olivia caused millions of dollars' worth of agricultural damage in California. In the state, half of the raisin crop, a quarter of the wine crop, and a tenth of the tomato crop were damaged. According to the California Farm Bureau Federation, up to $110 million (1982 USD) worth of almonds, beans, grapes, and melons could have been lost. Losses of the tomato crop were estimated to be between $30–40 million (1982 USD), while damage to raisin and wine crops reached $150 million (1982 USD). The California Farm Bureau Federation stated agricultural damages in the state could reach $450 million (1982 USD). The Monthly Weather Review estimated crop damage to be around $325 million (1982 USD).

=== Utah ===
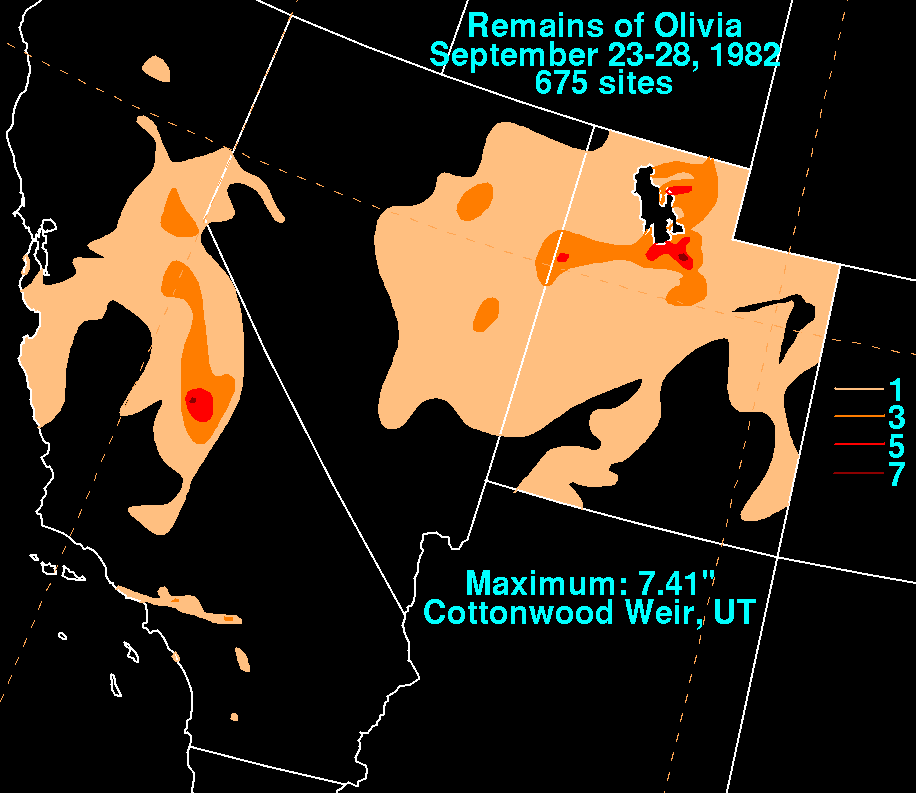
Rainfall associated with Hurricane Olivia in the United States

Ahead of the storm, a Flash flood watch was put in effect for parts of Utah on September 27. Flash flooding in Springdale swept mud and rocks through parts of the community. Rockslides forced the evacuation of campgrounds at Zion National Park. Several basements were flooded in Lehi. In Alpine, flooding isolated four houses. A mudslide was reported at the American Fork Canyon. Slick roads were reported at the Uinta and Wasatch National Forests, while a main road between several canyons was impassible.

Widespread floods occurred across the Salt Lake City metropolitan area. In Sandy, over 200 residences were inundated by floodwaters. Access to natural gas was shut off for a large number of homes in the area. Numerous bridges in the region were covered by water. The Jordan River became swollen following heavy rainfall in Salt Lake County. Officials ordered off-duty crews and volunteers to sandbag streams and the Jordan River, to prevent further flooding. In Murray, roughly 75 families were evacuated to churches and United States National Guard armory. Police closed off several highways, including U.S. Route 89, which was flooded by mountain run-off to the north of Ogden. Water from Spring Lake flooded a road in a nearby community of the same name. More than 1,000 residences were flooded within Salt Lake County. Sanitary sewers in Murray were clogged and water lines in Springdale burst.

Utah Governor Scott Matheson issued a state of emergency for parts of the state. He also ordered 200 National Guard troops to Salt Lake County. The Red Cross offered assistance to elderly people, while also conducting damage assessments. In Murray, the city searched for volunteers to help assist in cleanup efforts. The Red Cross provided shovels, mops, disinfectant, cots, and cooking utensils to requested areas. Cleanup crews removed debris following the floods, with corporate, municipal, and county crews repairing structures damaged by flooding. Following the destructive floods in Springdale, local officials created a flood control fund, worth $5,000 (1982 USD). Springdale was later declared an area of disaster by state government.

Flooding caused $500,000 (1982 USD) in damage in Washington County. Olivia was the wettest-tropical cyclone in Utah on record, dropping a peak precipitation amount of 7.41 inches (188.21 mm), in Cottonwood Weir. Damages in Utah were estimated to be between $13–25 million (1982 USD).

=== Elsewhere ===
Rainfall produced by Olivia was reported in Nevada. In Colorado, Montana, and Wyoming, moisture from Olivia caused snowfall in the Rocky Mountains. This prompted a travel alert to be issued for portions of the region. With 2.20 in (56 mm) of rain in Powell, Idaho, Olivia became the wettest tropical cyclone in state history at the time.Precipitation from the storm was also recorded in Southwestern Canada.

== See also ==
- List of Pacific hurricanes
- List of California hurricanes
- Hurricane Nora (1997) — took a nearly identical track and affected similar areas
- Hurricane Max (2005) — took similar impacts to Southern California brought identical to rain as a cold front on September 20, 2005
- Hurricane Dolores (2015) — caused similar impacts in California
- Hurricane Kay (2022) — Took a nearly identical and it was a remnant low in California
- Hurricane Hilary (2023) — Took an identical track and affected Southern California
- Hurricane Marie (2026)- Took a nearly identical track to Olivia and remnants brought heavy rain in Southern California
