= Rox =

Rox or ROX may refer to:

== Business ==
- Rox, a model of bicycle computer made by Sigma Sport
- ROX, ticker symbol and shorthand nomer for Castle Brands
- ROX, trade name for roxithromycin
- Rox Jewellers (retailer), in the United Kingdom

== Entertainment ==
=== Books ===
- The Rox, a renamed Ellis Island in the Wild Cards book series

=== Gaming ===
- Rox, a cosmetic outfit in Fortnite Battle Royale
- Rox, a videogame released in 1998 for Sega Saturn and in 2003 for PlayStation
- Rox, the currency in the children's online game Moshi Monsters

=== Music ===
- Rox (album), an album by California punk band Supernova
- "Rox", a song by Scottish band The Aliens from the album Astronomy for Dogs

=== Television ===
- Rox (American TV series)
- ROX (Belgian TV series)
- Rox, a main character in the animated television series Sunny Day

== People ==
- Rox, stage name of Roxanne Tataei (born 1988), English singer-songwriter
- Rox De Luca, Australian visual artist
- Rox Montealegre, Filipina actress
- Rox Santos, Filipino songwriter and record producer
- R. Rox Anderson, American dermatologist and entrepreneur
- Henry Rox, German-Jewish American artist, sculptor, photographer and university teacher
- John Rox, American composer and lyricist
- Katie Rox, Canadian singer-songwriter

== Places ==
- ROX, IATA code for Roseau Municipal Airport in Roseau, Minnesota, U.S.
- ROX, Chapman code for Roxburghshire, a historic county in Scotland
- Rox, Nevada, a ghost town in the United States

== Sports ==
- The Rox, a nickname for the Colorado Rockies
- The Rox, a nickname for the Houston Rockets
- Brockton Rox (disambiguation), baseball teams in Brockton, Massachusetts
- St. Cloud Rox (disambiguation), baseball teams in St. Cloud, Minnesota

== Other uses ==
- ROX Desktop, a Unix desktop environment based on the ROX-Filer file manager

== See also ==
- Roxy (disambiguation)
