= Hurricane Genevieve (2014) =

Pacific hurricane and typhoon in 2014

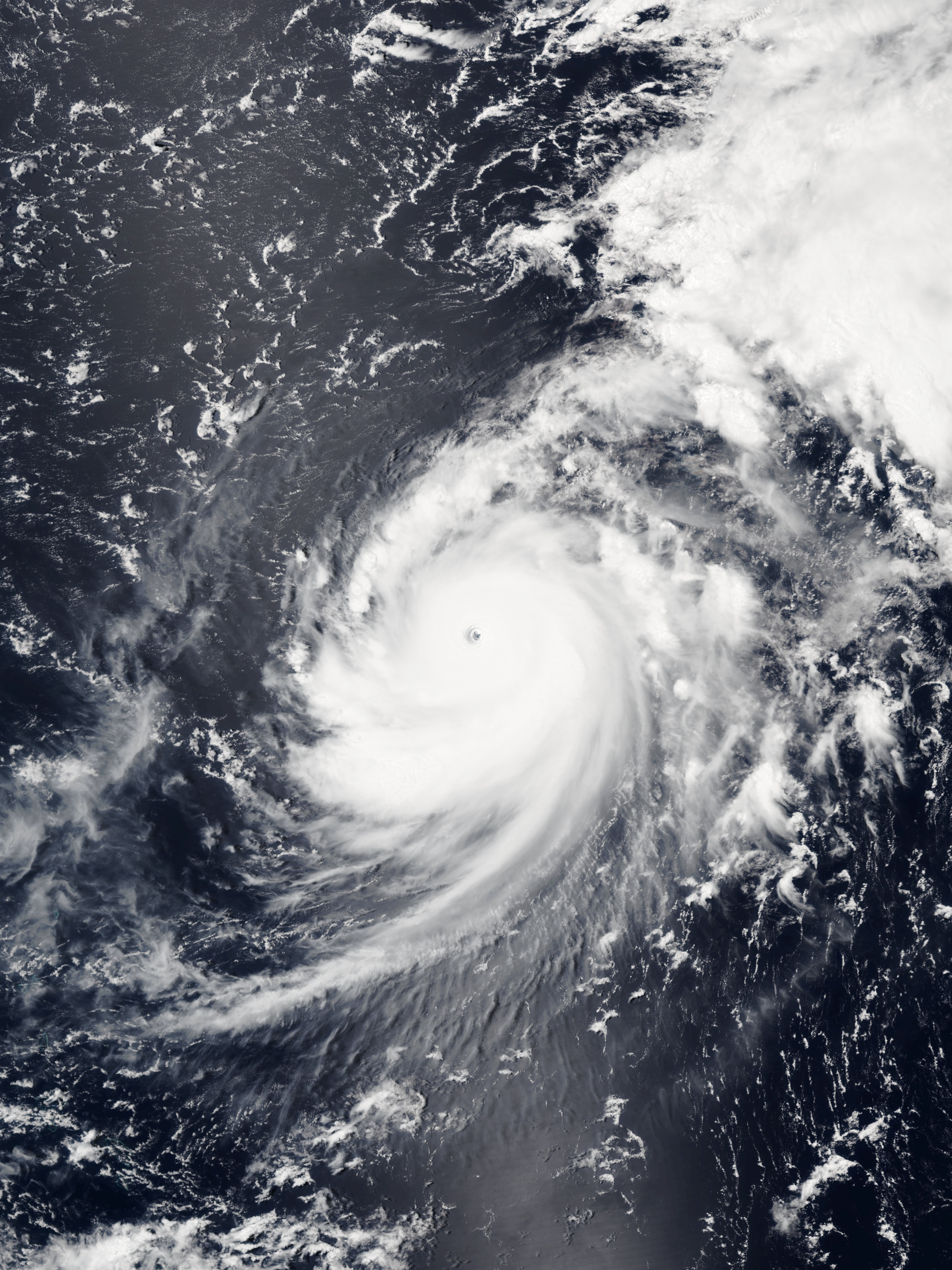
- Genevieve at peak intensity on August 8

Meteorological history
- Formed: July 25, 2014
- Post-tropical: August 14, 2014
- Dissipated: August 15, 2014

Violent typhoon
- 10-minute sustained (JMA)
- Highest winds: 205 km/h (125 mph)
- Lowest pressure: 915 hPa (mbar); 27.02 inHg

Category 5-equivalent super typhoon
- 1-minute sustained (SSHWS/JTWC)
- Highest winds: 260 km/h (160 mph)
- Lowest pressure: 918 hPa (mbar); 27.11 inHg

Overall effects
- Fatalities: None
- Damage: None
- Areas affected: None
- IBTrACS
- Part of the 2014 Pacific hurricane and typhoon seasons

Hurricane Genevieve, also referred to as Typhoon Genevieve, was the first tropical cyclone to track across all three northern Pacific basins since Hurricane Dora in 1999. Genevieve developed from a tropical wave into the eighth tropical storm of the 2014 Pacific hurricane season well east-southeast of Hawaii on July 25. However, increased vertical wind shear caused it to weaken into a tropical depression by the following day and degenerate into a remnant low on July 28. Late on July 29, the system regenerated into a tropical depression, but it weakened into a remnant low again on July 31, owing to vertical wind shear and dry air.

The remnants redeveloped into a tropical depression and briefly became a tropical storm south of Hawaii on August 2, yet it weakened back into a tropical depression soon afterwards. Late on August 5, Genevieve re-intensified into a tropical storm, and intensified into a Category 1 hurricane on the next day when undergoing rapid deepening because of favorable conditions. Early on August 7, Genevieve strengthened into a Category 4 hurricane, shortly before it crossed the International Date Line and was reclassified as a typhoon, also becoming the thirteenth named storm of the 2014 Pacific typhoon season. Late on the same day, Genevieve reached peak intensity while it was located west-southwest of Wake Island.

Typhoon Genevieve started to gradually weaken at noon on August 8, and stronger vertical wind shear provided by a TUTT cell began to weaken the system further on August 9. The typhoon crossed 30° north at noon on August 10 and weakened to a severe tropical storm soon afterwards, because of unfavorable sea surface temperature and expanding subsidence. Genevieve weakened into a tropical storm on August 11 and a tropical depression the following day, as its deep convection diminished. On August 13, the system turned northeastward, before degenerating into a post-tropical cyclone on August 14, with the JMA reporting the system to have dissipated. However, the Ocean Prediction Center (OPC) tracked Genevieve's remnants for another day, which crossed over the International Date Line again, until they were absorbed by another extratropical cyclone on August 15.

== Meteorological history ==
=== Origin and regeneration ===
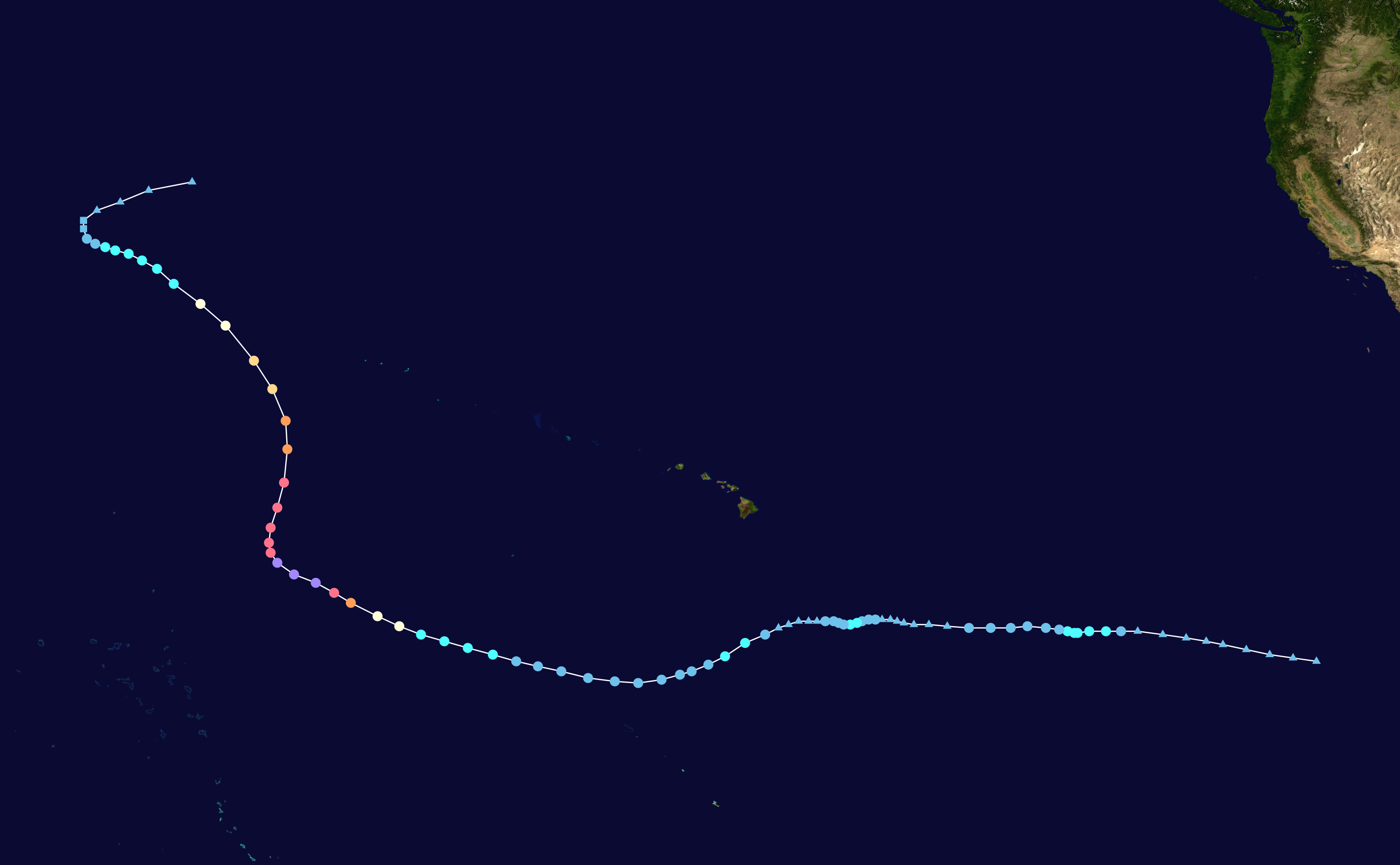
Map plotting the storm's track and intensity, according to the Saffir–Simpson scale Map key Saffir–Simpson scale Tropical depression (≤38 mph, ≤62 km/h) Tropical storm (39–73 mph, 63–118 km/h) Category 1 (74–95 mph, 119–153 km/h) Category 2 (96–110 mph, 154–177 km/h) Category 3 (111–129 mph, 178–208 km/h) Category 4 (130–156 mph, 209–251 km/h) Category 5 (≥157 mph, ≥252 km/h) Unknown Storm type Tropical cyclone Subtropical cyclone Extratropical cyclone, remnant low, tropical disturbance, or monsoon depression

The National Hurricane Center (NHC) began to monitor a tropical wave associated with a few showers and thunderstorms, moving westward off the coast of northern Central America on July 17. Four days later, thunderstorm activity became more concentrated; by July 22, the area of low-pressure became better organized. On July 23, the NHC noted that the system could become a tropical depression within the next two days; however, they also noted that wind shear could increase within a couple of days. Following an increase of deep convection developing near the center as well as the collection of ASCAT data showing an area of tropical storm-force winds, the NHC upgraded the system to Tropical Storm Genevieve on July 25. Shortly thereafter, the system attained its initial peak intensity of 45 mph (72 km/h).

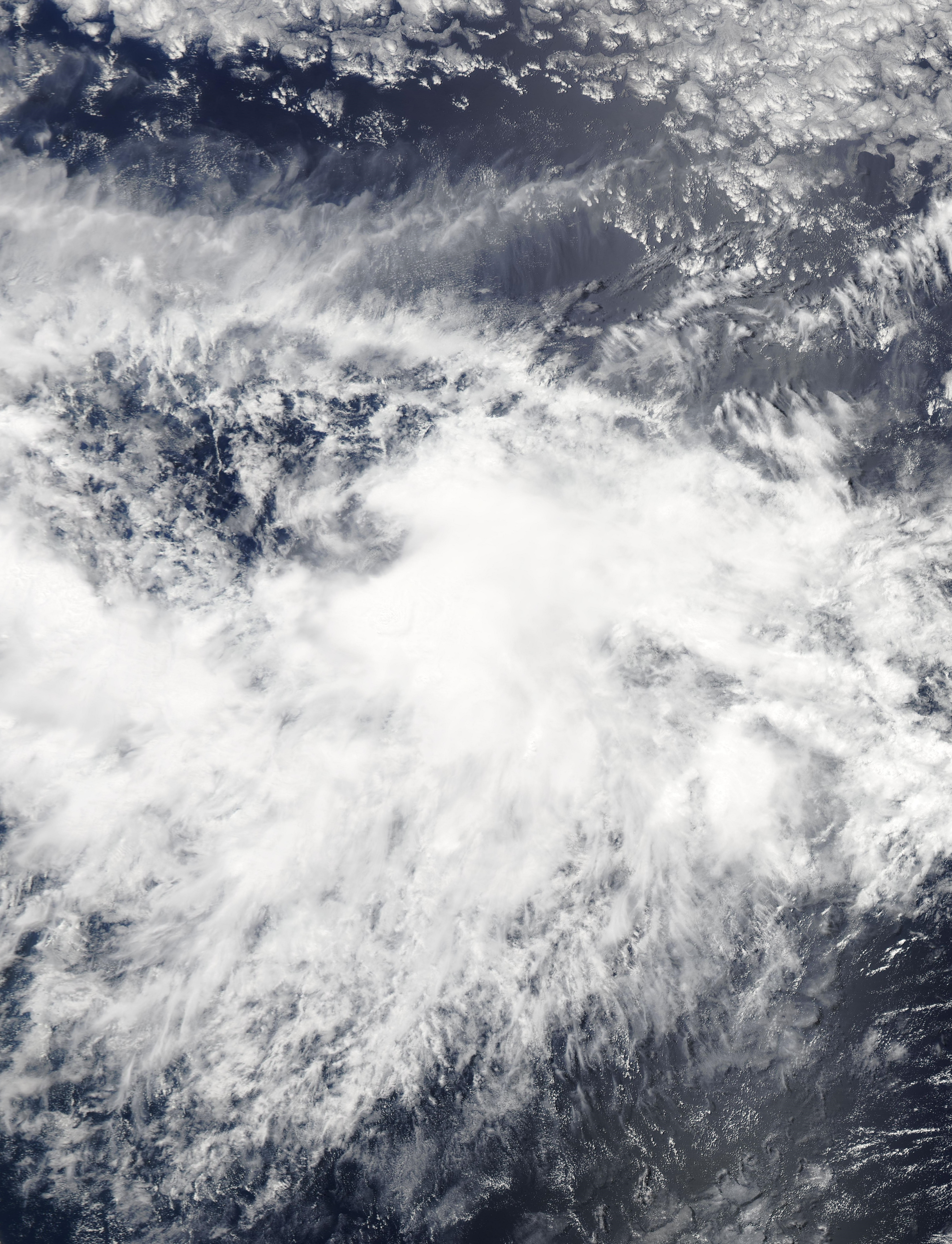
Tropical Storm Genevieve at its initial peak intensity on July 25

Shortly afterward, increased wind shear took its toll on the system, causing Genevieve to lose its organization as it continued westward, under the influence of a subtropical ridge and the Intertropical Convergence Zone. After the low-level center of circulation was exposed and became separated from the deep convection, the NHC subsequently downgraded it to a tropical depression on July 26. Although deep convection increased near the center early on the next day, Genevieve continued to battle westerly shear when crossing 140°W, moving into the waters monitored by the Central Pacific Hurricane Center (CPHC). Due to the lack of deep convection, the CPHC indicated that Genevieve had become a remnant low early on July 28, as only a low-level cloud swirl remained. However, the CPHC noted the possibility of re-development since shear was forecast to decrease.

Roughly 36 hours later, the remnants of Genevieve regenerated into a tropical depression to the southeast of the main Hawaiian Islands. The system briefly became better organized on July 30, prompting the CPHC to forecast the storm would re-intensify into a tropical storm. However, by the end of the day, the low-level circulation center had become displaced to the east of the deep convection due to increased southeasterly shear and infiltration of dry air. By 21:00 UTC July 31, the CPHC reported that Genevieve had once again degenerated to a remnant low, as only an isolated area of deep convection remained west of the center.

=== Intensification and peak intensity ===
The remnants of Genevieve continued to travel in a generally westward direction, moving into an environment more conducive for tropical cyclogenesis, and on the afternoon of August 2, Genevieve regenerated into a tropical depression, as the storm reacquired deep convection and its upper-level outflow pattern improved. By 21:00 UTC the same day, Genevieve reacquired tropical storm intensity, continuing to travel westward around the subtropical ridge to its north, but only six hours later, the CPHC downgraded Genevieve into a tropical depression. Deep convection near the center waxed and waned several times, but Genevieve failed to re-intensify. After moving west-southwest, Genevieve turned west-northwest on August 4 as it continued to track around the ridge to its north.

Despite moderate wind shear, convection soon wrapped around the southeastern side of the low-level circulation. By 21:00 UTC on August 5, the CPHC upgraded the system to a tropical storm, despite continued wind shear. Wind shear quickly decreased, triggering a period of rapid intensification. By the afternoon of August 6, Genevieve intensified to a low-end Category 1 hurricane; the system also developed a central dense overcast and well-organized banding around the newly-developed eye. Traversing over very warm sea surface temperatures, the intensification rate accelerated that evening. Based on advanced Dvorak technique estimates of 130 mph (210 km/h) as well as the presence of a very well-defined eye surrounded by very cold cloud tops, the CPHC upgraded the hurricane into Category 3 intensity on the Saffir-Simpson Hurricane Wind Scale early on the next day.

Infrared loop of Genevieve after it crossed the International Date Line

Genevieve crossed the International Date Line at 06:00 UTC on August 7, entering the area of responsibility of the RSMC Tokyo operated by the Japan Meteorological Agency (JMA). Thus, the JMA immediately recognized Genevieve as a typhoon with ten-minute maximum sustained winds at 115 mph (185 km/h). The Joint Typhoon Warning Center (JTWC) also upgraded Genevieve to a super typhoon, based on the compact and symmetric ring of uniform convection embedded with a 14 mi (23 km) eye, as well as excellent poleward outflow into the strong tropical upper tropospheric trough (TUTT) positioned to the north and northeast. Only six hours later, the JTWC reported that Genevieve had reached Category 5 status with one-minute sustained winds at 160 mph (260 km/h), when a microwave imagery revealed a 69 mi (111 km) diameter eyewall with a convective band over the south quadrant. As Genevieve continued to remain in a favorable environment with radial outflow and low vertical wind shear, the JMA indicated that the typhoon about 760 mi (1,220 km) east-southeast of Wake Island had reached its peak intensity late on August 7, with ten-minute maximum sustained winds at 125 mph (201 km/h).

=== Demise ===
During the morning of August 8, Genevieve started to track northward along the western periphery of a deep-layered subtropical ridge positioned to the east and northeast. Although the typhoon remained compact at noon, more fragmented deep convective banding revealed that Genevieve had begun a weakening trend. As the result, the JTWC downgraded Genevieve to a typhoon late on the same day, due to warmer convection surrounding the system. Early on August 9, Genevieve accelerated north-northeastward, and it began to encounter increasing vertical wind shear of 35 mph (56 km/h) with subsidence along the western periphery and weakening outflow into the TUTT. Therefore, the eye of the typhoon became cloud-filled, while the deepest convection around the core was also becoming warmer. The system began to track north-northwestward in the afternoon, when the cold dense overcast has decreased in size and become less symmetric.

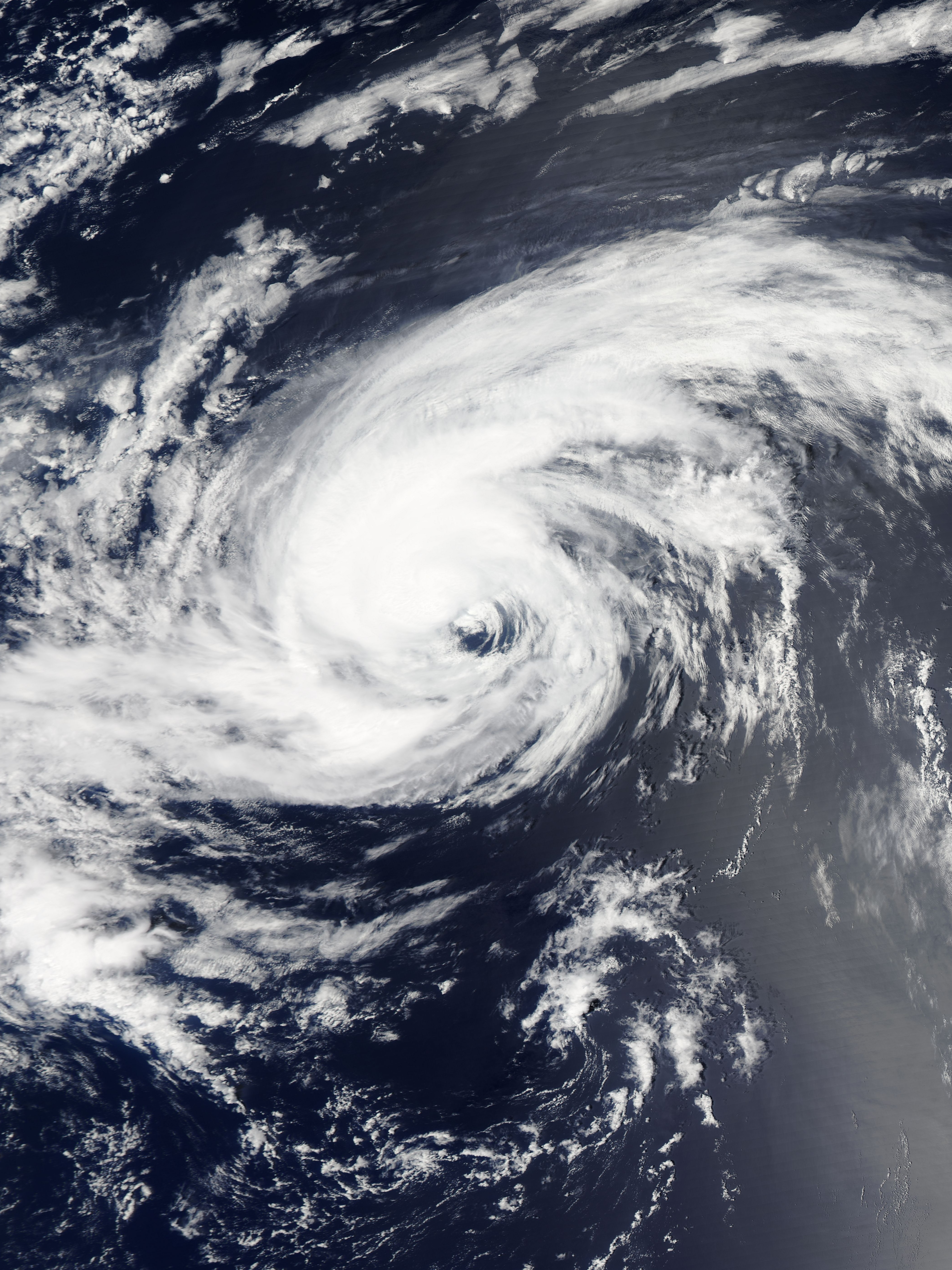
Severe Tropical Storm Genevieve on August 11

Genevieve reformed a 17 mi (27 km) eye with more symmetric and organized convection for short time early on August 10, but the eye disappeared very soon as the system elongated more. Upper-level analysis indicated a complex environment— an anticyclone located to the southeast, a TUTT cell to the west, and a second anticyclone to the north. The TUTT cell and the first anticyclone caused strong upper-level southwestern flow and moderate vertical wind shear over the system, but the issues were offset by the quick speed of the typhoon. Tracking northwestward, Genevieve crossed 30°N at noon and began to encounter unfavorable sea surface temperatures less than 79 °F (26 °C). At the same time, a digging trough was expanding the region of subsidence which isolated the core from the tropical moisture along the equatorward periphery. Later, deep convection along the tightly-wrapped low-level circulation center of the typhoon rapidly diminished as dry air surrounded the system.

Late on August 10, the JMA downgraded Genevieve to a severe tropical storm about 670 mi (1,080 km) west-northwest of Midway Atoll, and the JTWC downgraded it to a tropical storm early on the next day. Dry air, cool ocean temperatures and a rapid weakening of the linkage to tropical moisture made deep convection over the storm almost completely dissipate. This process was hastened by the disintegration of the TUTT cell which had helped to enhance equatorward outflow. Under the combination of many unfavorable environmental factors, the JMA downgraded the rapidly weakening system to a tropical storm, when it started to move west-northwestward and slowed down at noon. Owing to diminished convection associated with a weak low-level circulation center, the JTWC issued its final warning and downgraded Genevieve to a tropical depression late on the same day.

After the JMA downgraded Genevieve to a tropical depression at 06:00 UTC on August 12, the system drifted westward and then northwestward very slowly until it accelerated northeastward late on August 13. The JMA reported that Genevieve had dissipated as a tropical depression before noon on August 14; however, the Ocean Prediction Center indicated that this post-tropical cyclone crossed the International Date Line and entered the Central North Pacific Ocean again late on the same day. The remnants of Genevieve were eventually absorbed by another extratropical cyclone before noon on August 15.

== See also ==
- Weather of 2014
- Tropical cyclones in 2014
- Other tropical cyclones named Genevieve
- Hurricane John (1994)
- Hurricane Dora (1999)
- Hurricane Jimena (2003)
- Hurricane Ioke (2006)
- Hurricane Hector (2018)
- Hurricane Dora (2023)
- Hurricane Nolo (2026)
