= Brockton Rox =

Brockton Rox may refer to one of the following American baseball teams:

- Brockton Rox (Frontier League), a professional team competing in the Frontier League that played their first season (2024) as the New England Knockouts
- Brockton Rox (2002–2024), a team that played professionally during 2002–2011 in three different leagues, then played in the Futures Collegiate Baseball League before folding after the 2024 season

== See also ==
- Rox (disambiguation)
