= Hurricane Genevieve (2020) =

Category 4 Pacific hurricane in 2020

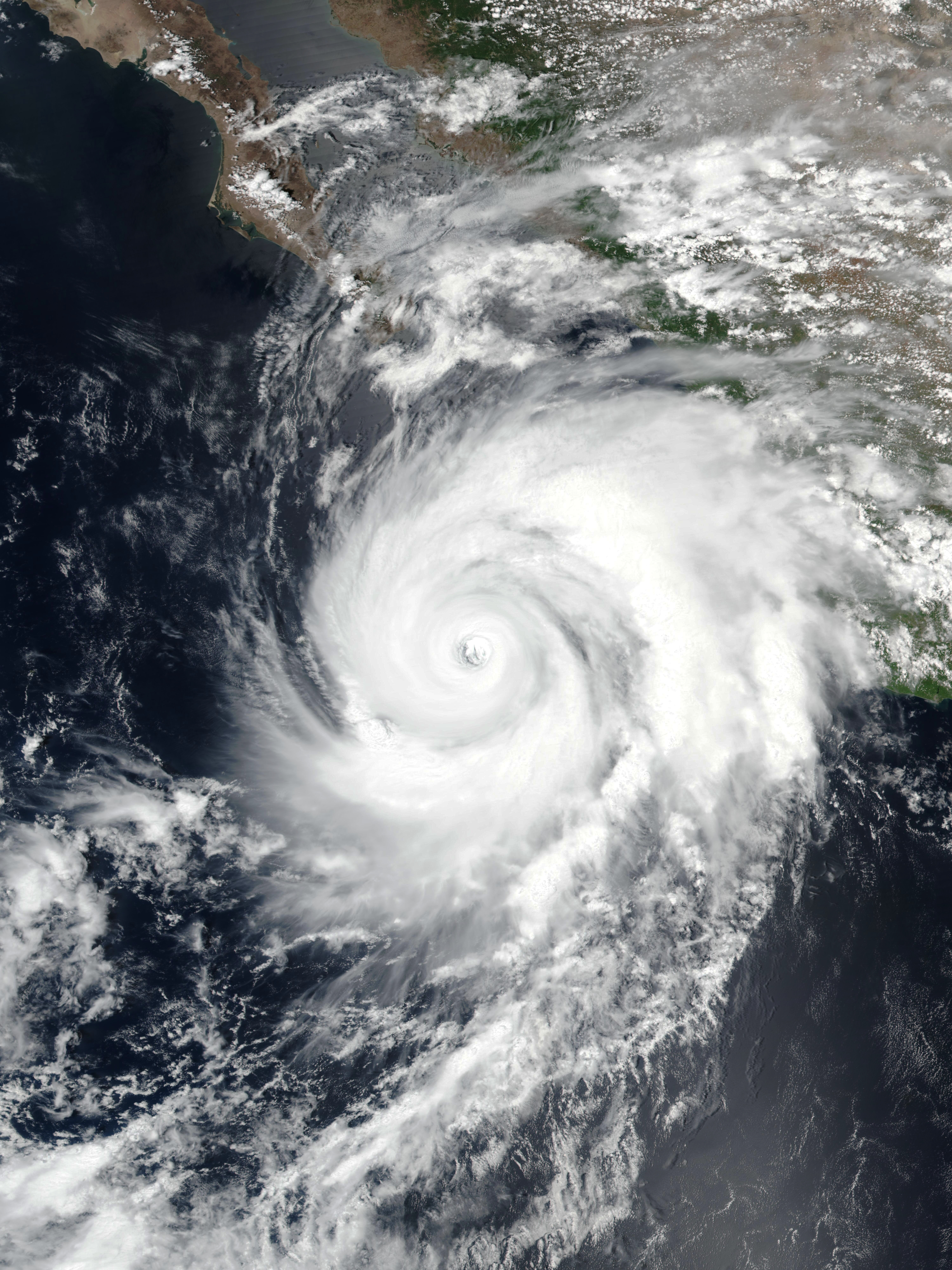
- Genevieve at peak intensity offshore Mexico on August 18

Meteorological history
- Formed: August 16, 2020
- Remnant low: August 21, 2020
- Dissipated: August 24, 2020

Category 4 major hurricane
- 1-minute sustained (SSHWS/NWS)
- Highest winds: 130 mph (215 km/h)
- Lowest pressure: 950 mbar (hPa); 28.05 inHg

Overall effects
- Fatalities: 6
- Damage: $50 million (2020 USD)
- Areas affected: Southwestern Mexico, Socorro Island, Baja California Peninsula, Southern California
- IBTrACS /
- Part of the 2020 Pacific hurricane season

Hurricane Genevieve was a strong tropical cyclone that almost made landfall on the Baja California Peninsula in August 2020. Genevieve was the twelfth tropical cyclone, seventh named storm, (Note: This excludes an unnamed tropical storm in July 2020.) third hurricane, and second major hurricane of the 2020 Pacific hurricane season. The cyclone formed from a tropical wave that the National Hurricane Center (NHC) first started monitoring on August 10. The wave merged with a trough of low pressure on August 13, and favorable conditions allowed the wave to intensify into Tropical Depression Twelve-E at 15:00 UTC. Just six hours later, the depression became a tropical storm and was given the name Genevieve. Genevieve quickly became a hurricane by August 17, and Genevieve began explosive intensification the next day. By 12:00 UTC on August 18, Genevieve reached its peak intensity as a Category 4 hurricane, with maximum 1-minute sustained winds of 130 mph and a minimum central pressure of 950 millibars (28 inHg). Genevieve began to weaken on the next day, possibly due to cooler waters caused by Hurricane Elida earlier that month. Genevieve weakened below tropical storm status around 18:00 UTC on August 20, as it passed close to Baja California Sur. Soon afterward, Genevieve began to lose its deep convection and became a post-tropical cyclone by 21:00 UTC on August 21, eventually dissipating off the coast of Southern California late on August 24.

Hurricane-force gusts affected parts of Baja California as Genevieve passed close by. Several inches of rain caused flooding near Cabo San Lucas on August 20. A total of six deaths were attributed to Genevieve across Mexico. Total economic losses associated with Genevieve reached US$50 million in Mexico.

== Meteorological history ==
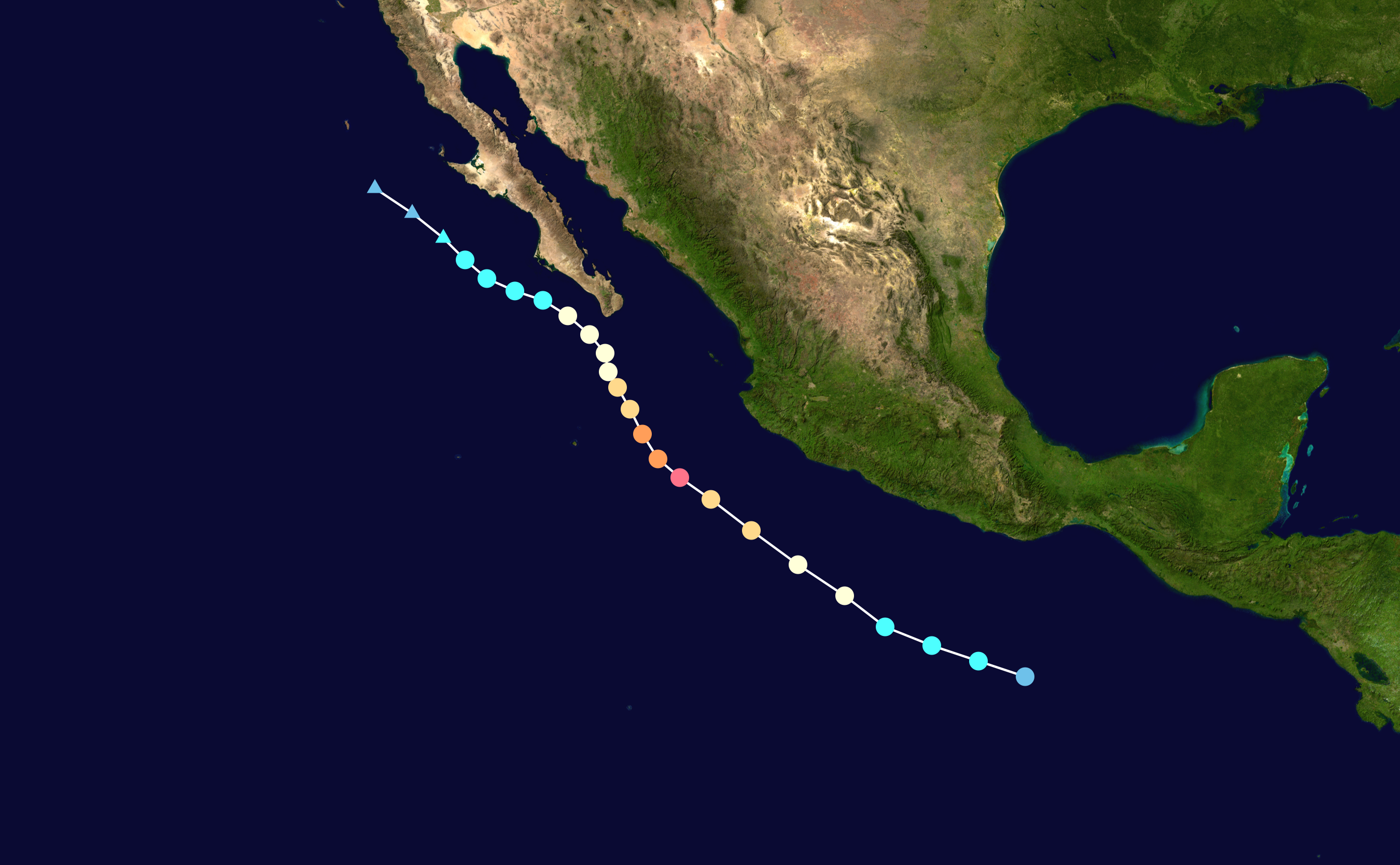
Map plotting the storm's track and intensity, according to the Saffir–Simpson scale Map key Saffir–Simpson scale Tropical depression (≤38 mph, ≤62 km/h) Tropical storm (39–73 mph, 63–118 km/h) Category 1 (74–95 mph, 119–153 km/h) Category 2 (96–110 mph, 154–177 km/h) Category 3 (111–129 mph, 178–208 km/h) Category 4 (130–156 mph, 209–251 km/h) Category 5 (≥157 mph, ≥252 km/h) Unknown Storm type Tropical cyclone Subtropical cyclone Extratropical cyclone, remnant low, tropical disturbance, or monsoon depression

On August 10, the NHC noted the possibility of an area of low pressure forming near Central America within the next few days. On August 13, a tropical wave entered the Eastern Pacific basin from Central America. Later that day, the NHC's forecast was realized, as a trough of low pressure developed just offshore Central America, in association with the tropical wave. The disturbance gradually organized, and on August 16, the system became a tropical depression, receiving the designation Twelve-E at 15:00 UTC. The depression rapidly strengthened and became a tropical storm 6 hours later at 21:00 UTC, receiving the name Genevieve. Genevieve continued to strengthen rapidly overnight as it developed an inner core, and the storm became a Category 1 hurricane on August 17, reaching 1-minute sustained winds of 75 mph (121 km/h). Genevieve continued to rapidly intensify as it began to grow an eye along with well-defined banding features, later that day. By 03:00 UTC the next day, Genevieve had intensified into a Category 2 hurricane, as strong outflow became evident and the eye began to grow, though it remained clouded. Just 6 hours later, Genevieve became a Category 3 hurricane, as an eyewall and a well-defined eye became visible.

Three hours later, at 12:00 UTC on August 18, Genevieve intensified further into a Category 4 hurricane, and the storm reached its peak intensity, with maximum 1-minute sustained winds of 130 mph (210 km/h) and a minimum central pressure of 950 millibars (28 inHg). Later that day, as Genevieve maintained its intensity, imagery showed an almost-circular eye, along with a well-defined inner core. On the next day, Genevieve began to weaken, with no signs of an eyewall replacement cycle, hinting at weakening possibly due to a cold wake left behind by Hurricane Elida, earlier that month. Genevieve continued a gradual weakening trend for the next several hours, but later that day, data from an NHC Reconnaissance Flight indicated that Genevieve was rapidly weakening, with the storm dropping to Category 1 status by 21:00 UTC that day. On August 20, Genevieve turned northwestward and passed very close to Cabo San Lucas, at the southern tip of the Baja California Peninsula, and the system weakened further into a tropical storm at 18:00 UTC. By 21:00 UTC on August 21, Genevieve had degenerated into a post-tropical cyclone, after having no deep convection near its center for 12 hours. At 12:00 UTC on August 22, Genevieve's remnant low dissipated. However, Genevieve's remnant circulation continued to persist for another couple of days, stalling off the coast of Southern California on August 23. Genevieve's remnants dissipated by 00:00 UTC on August 25.

== Preparations and impact ==
=== Mexico ===
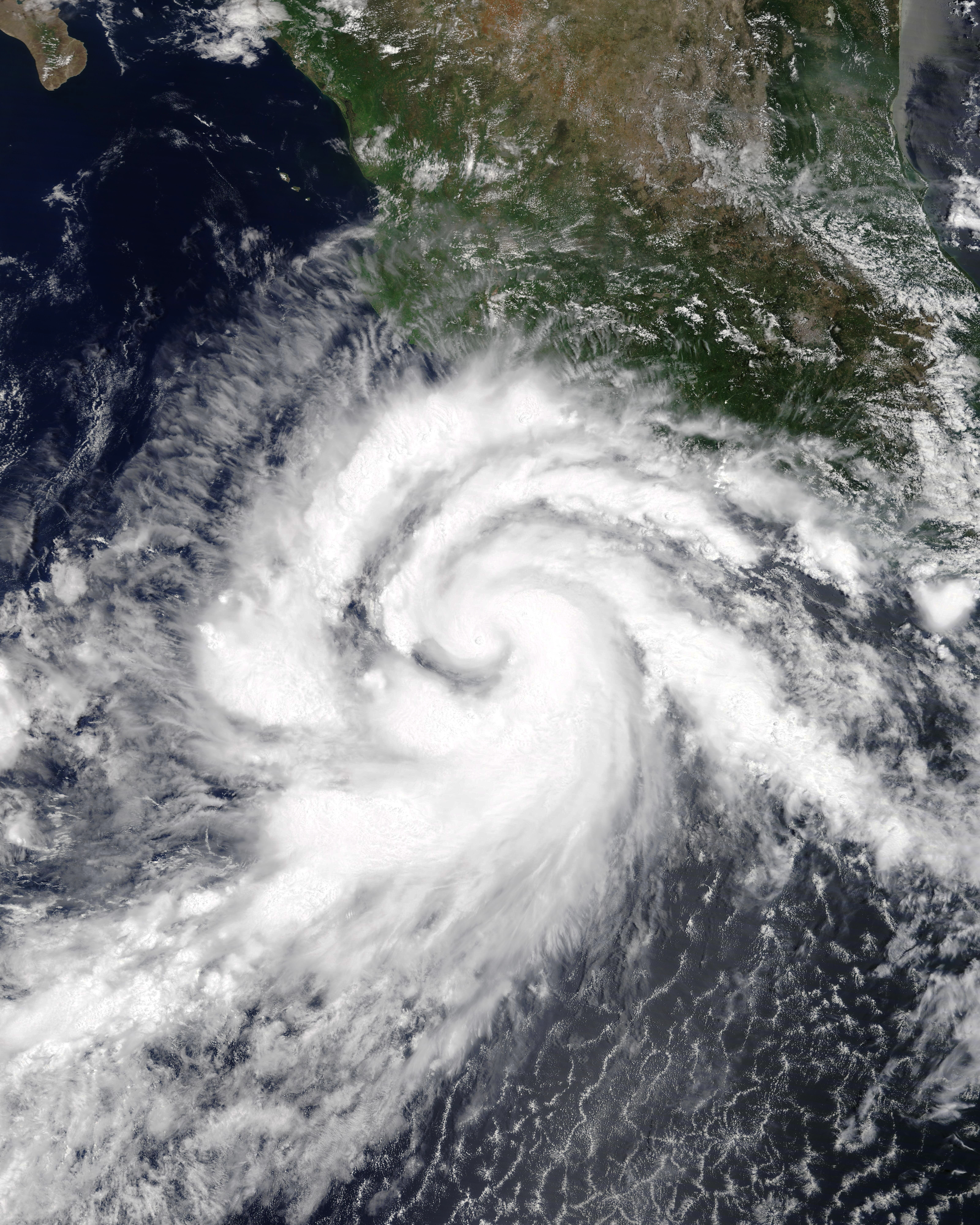
Hurricane Genevieve strengthening while dropping heavy rainfall over southwestern Mexico, on August 17

As Hurricane Genevieve rapidly intensified on August 17, the Government of Mexico issued a tropical storm watch for southern areas of Baja California Sur. This was later raised to a tropical storm warning the next day, and a hurricane warning on August 19. These advisories were subsequently discontinued as the storm weakened and moved away from the Baja California Peninsula on August 21. An estimated 8 million people were threatened by the hurricane across the west coast of Mexico. Accordingly, approximately 1,600 shelters were opened nationwide: 571 in Jalisco, 434 in Nayarit, 237 in Colima, 179 in Michoacán, and 175 in Baja California Sur. Even without officials asking residents to do so, residents of Baja California prepared for damaging winds.

Thunderstorms associated with the outer bands of Genevieve produced gusty winds and heavy rain in Oaxaca, with accumulations averaging 3.0 to 5.9 in (75 to 150 mm) and gusts reaching 43 to 50 mph (70 to 80 km/h). Four people were killed in the state: two from landslides in Huautla de Jiménez and two from swollen rivers. Water reached a depth of 1.6 ft (0.5 m) in Puerto Ángel. The Caminos y Aeropistas de Oaxaca deployed 32 personnel to repair damage to roads. Emergency declarations were issued for 13 municipalities. Localized flash flooding impacted parts of Acapulco, with cars washed away and some homes inundated. Large swells impacted the coast of Jalisco. Fourteen families were relocated in Cihuatlán.

Heavy rainfall impacted much of Baja California Sur as Genevieve brushed the state; accumulations peaked at 11 in (280 mm) in Cabo San Lucas. In the mountainous terrain south of Cabo San Lucas, wind gusts reached 90 mph (140 km/h). Electrical and road infrastructure was damaged statewide, and some areas were without power for more than 24 hours. A lifeguard drowned while attempting to save a teen who also died after ignoring warning flags prompted by rough surf produced by Genevieve, at a resort in Cabo San Lucas. On August 23, the Coordinación Nacional de Protección Civil declared a state of emergency for the municipalities of La Paz and Los Cabos. This allowed the distribution of government aid and supplies to affected residents. Heavy machinery was used to clear roads of debris and mud left behind by floods. Economic losses in Mexico reached $50 million (2020 USD), due to Genevieve.

=== United States ===
On August 22, moisture from Hurricane Genevieve's remnants brought heavy rainfall to parts of Southern California, which continued until August 24. This brought fears of wildfires in the region, due to the potential for lightning storms; the region was already being impacted by fires produced by Tropical Storm Fausto's thunderstorms just days earlier. On August 22, a red flag warning was put in effect for most of coastal California. Fortunately, lightning strikes ignited only three small fires, which were able to be brought under control, near the larger SCU Lightning Complex fires. However, thunderstorms produced by Genevieve worsened conditions for firefighters battling three other wildfires in the San Francisco Bay Area. A peak wind gust of around 35 mph (56 km/h) was reported along Interstate 580 on August 22. Despite this, no monetary damages were reported in association with Genevieve in the United States.

== See also ==
- Weather of 2020
- Tropical cyclones in 2020
- List of Category 4 Pacific hurricanes
- Other tropical cyclones of the same name
- List of Baja California Peninsula hurricanes
- List of California hurricanes
- Hurricane Jimena (2009)
- Hurricane Odile (2014)
- Hurricane Blanca (2015)
- Hurricane Dolores (2015)
