= Hurricane Dolores (2015) =

Category 4 Pacific hurricane in 2015

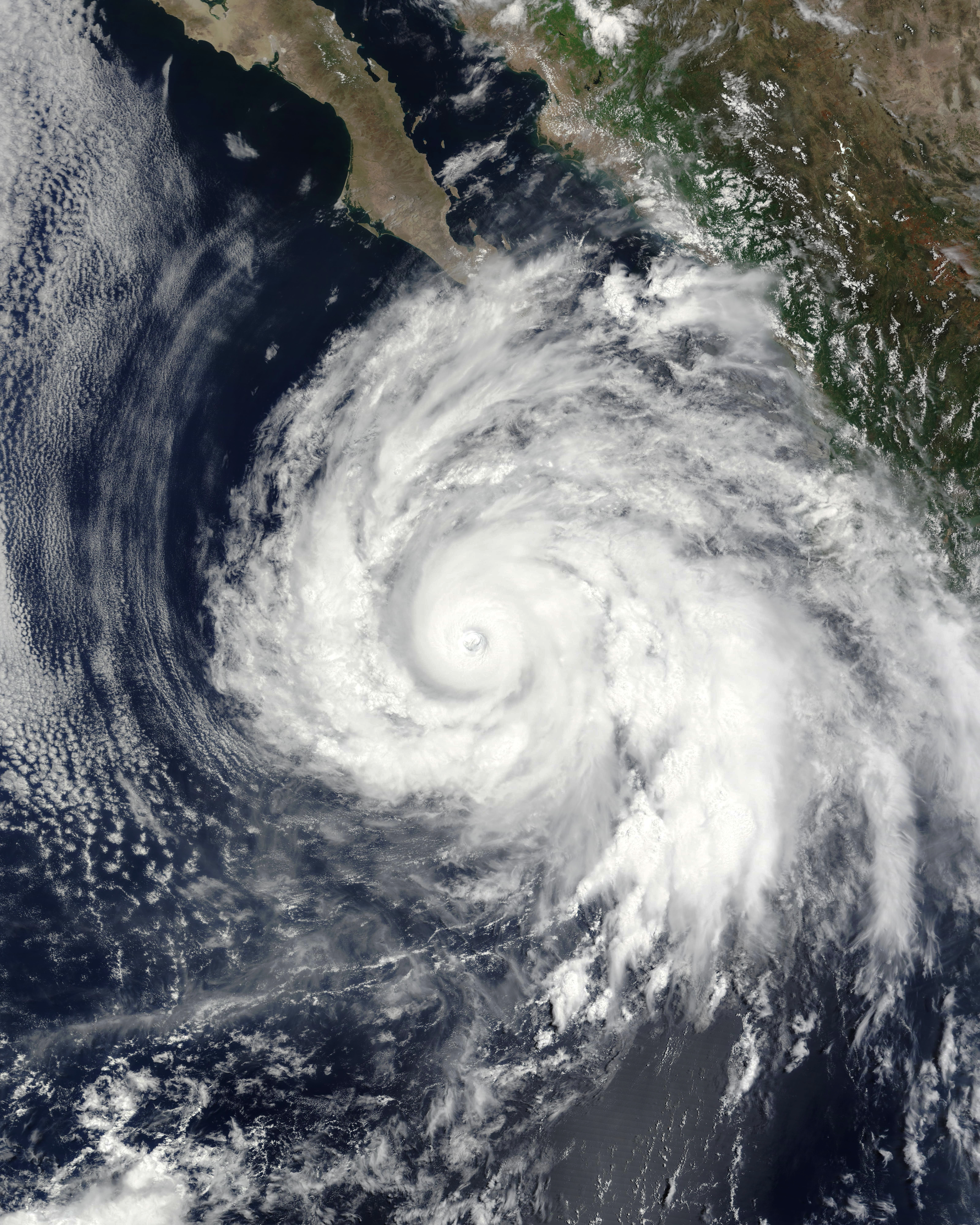
- Dolores near peak intensity south of the Baja California peninsula on July 15.

Meteorological history
- Formed: July 11, 2015
- Remnant low: July 18, 2015
- Dissipated: July 21, 2015

Category 4 major hurricane
- 1-minute sustained (SSHWS/NWS)
- Highest winds: 130 mph (215 km/h)
- Lowest pressure: 946 mbar (hPa); 27.94 inHg

Overall effects
- Fatalities: 2 total
- Damage: $51.3 million
- Areas affected: Mexico, Southwestern United States (especially California)
- IBTrACS /
- Part of the 2015 Pacific hurricane season

Hurricane Dolores was a powerful tropical cyclone, whose remnants produced a 1-in-500 year event in Riverside County, California. The seventh named-storm, fourth hurricane, and third major hurricane (Note: A major hurricane is one that ranks at Category 3 or higher on the Saffir–Simpson scale.) of the record-breaking 2015 Pacific hurricane season, Dolores formed from a tropical wave that crossed into the Northeastern Pacific tropical cyclone basin from Central America on July 8. The wave spawned an area of low pressure, which organized into a tropical depression at 12:00 Coordinated Universal Time (UTC) on July 11. (Note: All dates and times are in Coordinated Universal Time (UTC)) The cyclone strengthened into a tropical storm six hours later, receiving the name Dolores from the National Hurricane Center (NHC). At 12:00 UTC on July 13, Dolores became a Category 1 hurricane. The cyclone subsequently underwent a period of rapid intensification, finally peaking as a Category 4 hurricane, with maximum 1-minute sustained winds of 130 mph (215 km/h) and a minimum central pressure of 946 mbar (27.9 inHg), at 06:00 UTC on July 15. An eyewall replacement cycle and cooler sea-surface temperatures weakened Dolores rapidly, and the storm fell to tropical storm intensity just two days later. At 18:00 UTC on July 18, Dolores degenerated into a remnant low west of the Baja California Peninsula. The remnants drifted northward, towards California, before turning southwestward and dissipating on July 21.

The proximity of Dolores to Mexico led to tropical storm watches being issued for parts of the coastline. Those were later discontinued as Dolores began tracking westward away from land areas. Mexican authorities advised people to take precautions and issued alerts. Hurricane conditions were reported on Socorro Island, an island in the open Pacific owned by Mexico. In Jalisco and Cólima, heavy rainfall was reported, with a few rockslides and minor damage. Further north, a large flash flood affected the city of Tijuana. Over 300 structures were damaged and destroyed, and cars and furniture were swept away.

Dolores produced large waves up to 10 ft (3.0 m) high and dangerous rip currents, drowning a swimmer in Zuma Beach in California. There were many occurrences of flash flooding and severe weather associated with the remnants of Dolores in California and the Southwestern United States. Heavy rain totaling up to 4 in (100 mm) in San Diego and Los Angeles counties broke historic records. Precipitation measurement tools estimated up to 10.6 in (270 mm) of rainfall fell in some areas of California. The Los Angeles Angels experienced their first rain out since 1995. Many highways, including Interstates 5, 8, 10, 15, 80, 215, and 805 were closed due to flooding, mudslides, and severe weather. A bridge on Interstate 10 in Riverside County was washed out, injuring a driver and forcing the closure of both the eastbound and westbound lanes. More than 2,000 lightning strikes were recorded in San Diego County, sparking bushfires and causing a tree to fall on a home. A man was killed by a lightning strike in Kern County, and another man was injured by lightning in San Bernardino County. In Arizona, flash flooding damaged many buildings and roads in Wickenburg. A total of 36 power poles were brought down in Mohave County, and hurricane-force wind gusts were recorded. Similar occurrences were observed in Nevada. Total damage from the hurricane was estimated at US$ 51.136 million. (Note: All monetary values are in 2015 United States Dollar (USD).)

== Meteorological history ==
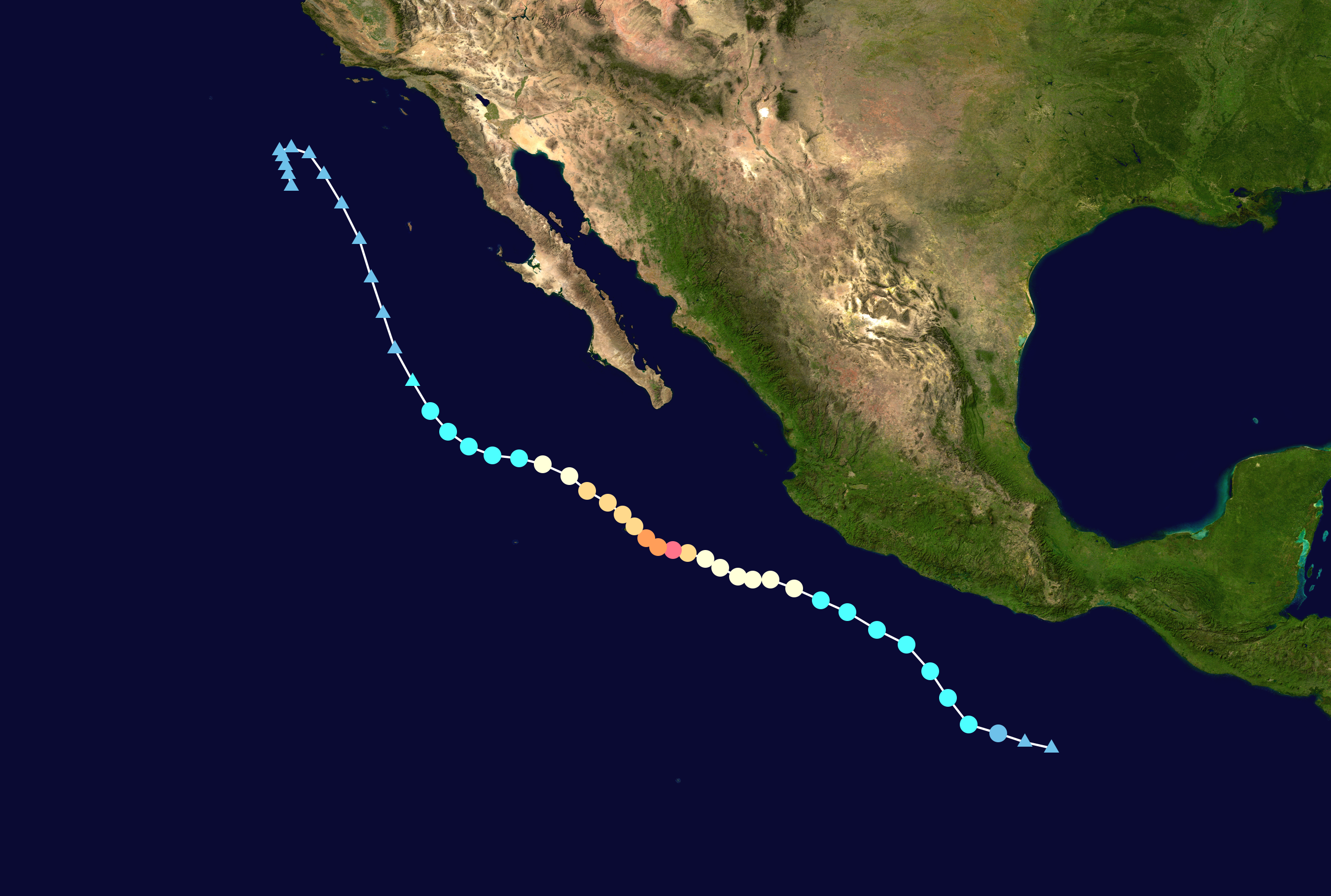
Map plotting the storm's track and intensity, according to the Saffir–Simpson scale Map key Saffir–Simpson scale Tropical depression (≤38 mph, ≤62 km/h) Tropical storm (39–73 mph, 63–118 km/h) Category 1 (74–95 mph, 119–153 km/h) Category 2 (96–110 mph, 154–177 km/h) Category 3 (111–129 mph, 178–208 km/h) Category 4 (130–156 mph, 209–251 km/h) Category 5 (≥157 mph, ≥252 km/h) Unknown Storm type Tropical cyclone Subtropical cyclone Extratropical cyclone, remnant low, tropical disturbance, or monsoon depression

The possibility of tropical cyclogenesis from a tropical disturbance south of Mexico was first mentioned by the NHC on July 6, 2015. A tropical wave, which is an area of relatively low atmospheric pressure that spans from east to west in the tropics, crossed Central America and entered the Eastern Pacific Ocean on July 8. The next day, the wave spawned a weak area of low pressure while south of Guatemala. On July 10, the disturbance quickly organized, with convection, or thunderstorms, becoming more concentrated near the center of the low. This was due to an interaction with a strong upper-level trough to the west of the wave. Although the trough moved away from the tropical wave later that day, strong upper-level divergence maintained convection. Early on July 11, satellite images showed that the disturbance was consolidating into a tropical depression, and at 12:00 UTC, the NHC designated the system as Tropical Depression Five-E while located roughly 345 mi (555 km) south-southeast of Acapulco, Mexico. The system's development and tropical cyclogenesis was enhanced by external forces from the upper-level trough; this type of tropical cyclogenesis was quite rare in the Eastern Pacific Ocean. The depression gradually organized, developing banding features around the eastern portion of the system. Late that day, a small central dense overcast developed near the low-level circulation center. A ship near northeastern quadrant of the storm reported sustained winds of 40 mph (64 km/h), and an Advanced Scatterometer pass indicated 49 mph (79 km/h) winds; the depression was upgraded to a tropical storm and received the name Dolores based on this data.

Despite nearly-ideal environmental conditions that were largely favorable for strengthening, moderate northwesterly wind shear caused by a upper-level trough initially prevented much intensification. The storm slowly strengthened on July 11 while moving northwestward, several hundred miles off the coast of Southwestern Mexico. The cloud pattern of the storm grew more and more organized throughout July 12, with symmetric and organized convection over the center, signalling less impediment from the shear, though outflow remained restricted over the western portion of the system. Dolores attained hurricane status at 12:00 UTC on July 13, as it turned westward away from the Mexican coastline, with a ragged eye developing alongside more convective banding. As wind shear northwest of the storm began relaxing, spiraling bands began developing over the western portion of the storm's center. Dolores continued to gradually organize and intensify, though dry air entrainments briefly halted intensification. However, soon afterward, at 00:00 UTC on July 15, Dolores rapidly intensified into a Category 2 hurricane, with the eye becoming more apparent on satellite imagery and very cold cloud tops developing near the center of circulation. Six hours later, Dolores peaked as a Category 4 hurricane with winds of 130 mph (215 km/h) and a minimum pressure of 946 mbar (hPa; 27.94 inHg). Dolores became the earliest occurrence of the third Category 4 hurricane recorded of a Pacific hurricane season, surpassing Hurricane Frank, which attained Category 4 status on July 17, 1992.

The strengthening trend was short-lived, however, as the cloud tops in the eyewall began to warm soon after it achieved peak intensity. As Dolores approached Socorro Island, the cyclone underwent an eyewall replacement cycle and began to steadily weaken. The storm exhibited winds of 105 mph (170 km/h) as it passed within 20 mi (32 km) of the island. After completing the cycle on July 16, Dolores exhibited annular characteristics, with a symmetric structure and wide eye. The NHC described the eyewall as thick and "donut-shaped". Cloud tops briefly cooled, which usually signals the redevelopment of strong thunderstorms, but dry air had begun to mix into the circulation. Around this time, Dolores reached cooler sea surface temperatures, resulting in slow but continuous weakening. Throughout the early hours of July 17, Dolores's structure continued to decay, with an eye no longer apparent on visible satellite imagery and convection waning. The continued effects of cool sea-surface temperatures, abetted by strong wind shear, decoupled the low- and mid-level circulation centers on July 18. Around this time, the rapidly weakening cyclone accelerated north-northwestward between a subtropical ridge to the east and a trough offshore California. By 12:00 UTC that day, Dolores had deteriorated into a tropical storm, with no convection near its center. The system eventually degenerated into a post-tropical remnant low about 300 mi (480 km) west of the Baja California coast at 18:00 UTC on July 18.

From July 18 to 19, the remnants stalled southwest of San Diego, causing its moisture to be carried northward. Initially, only light rain was forecast for California. However, dew points rose to around 70 °F (21 °C), and atmospheric instability was greater than expected. As a result, severe thunderstorms with heavy rain formed. The rainstorms that Dolores had caused were blamed on the slow movement of the storm, as well as enhanced moisture from the record-breaking 2014–2016 El Niño event, which was the same phenomenon that caused the above-average 2015 Pacific hurricane season. The remnant low slowly curved southward, before dissipating on July 22, a few hundred miles west of San Diego, California. Christopher Landsea, a meteorologist at the NHC, noted that the strong subtropical ridge present in typical Pacific hurricane seasons during July was quite weak in 2015. The ridge, normally stationed over Mexico, would drive tropical cyclones westward, but the weakness allowed Dolores to become one of the northernmost traveling tropical cyclones on record in the Northeast Pacific basin in July.

== Preparations and impact ==
=== Mexico ===
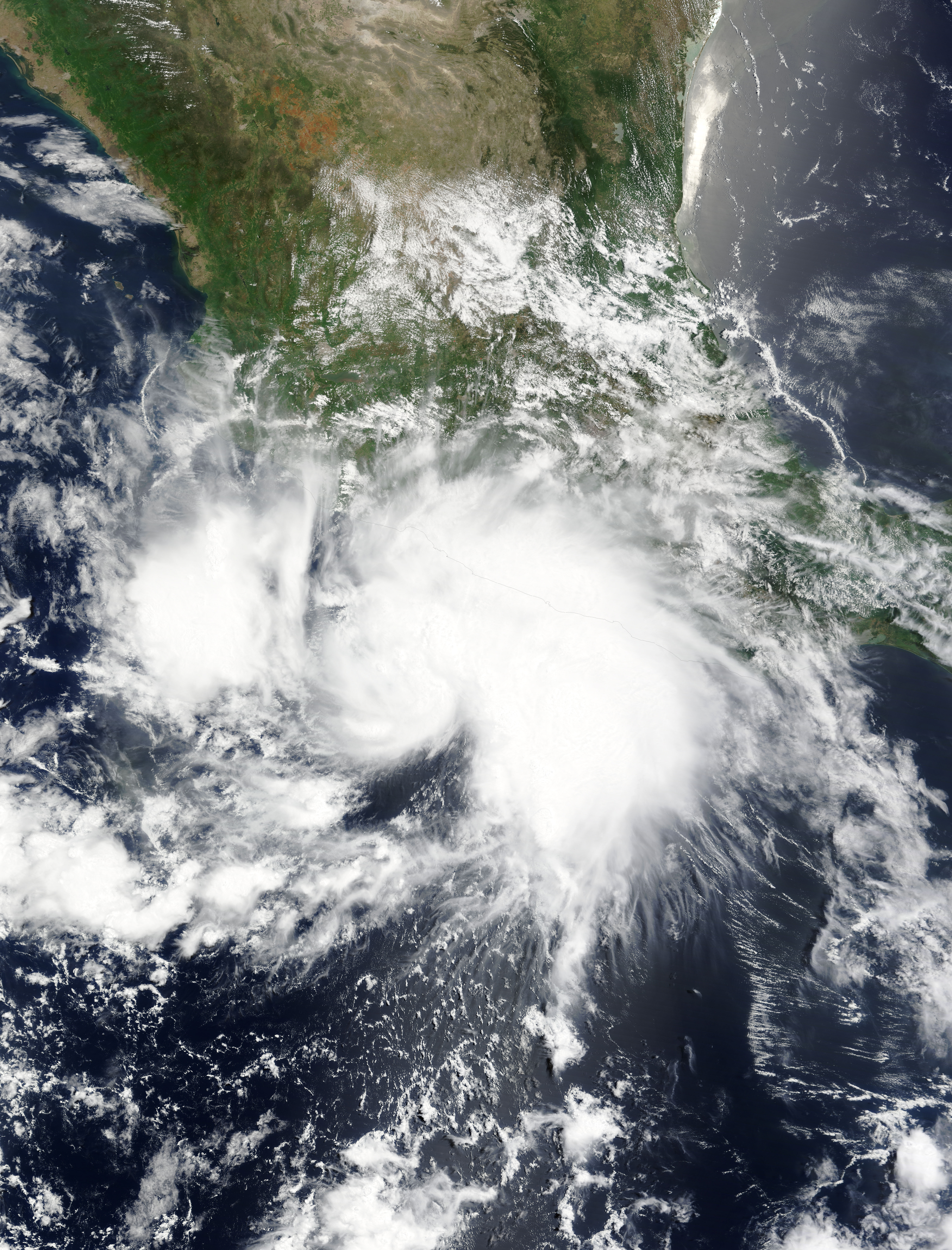
Rainbands from Dolores located over Southwestern Mexico

Due to the threat of tropical storm-force winds reaching the coast, Tropical Storm Watches were issued by the Government of Mexico for parts of the southwestern coast of the country, from Lázaro Cárdenas to Cabo Corrientes. These watches were discontinued on July 13, when Dolores pulled out to sea. The Mexican National Service also warned of hailstorms and waves of 4 to 5 m (13 to 16 ft). The agency ordered mariners, along with tourists and people engaging in recreational activities, to take "extreme caution" due to storm surge. The weather service also advised residents to be attentive to the statements issued by authorities and the National Civil Protection System after rainfall in association with Dolores and other weather systems was forecast to affect the entire country. Oswaldo Hernández Arvizu, director of the Civil Protection Element in Jalisco, warned of landslides and recommended people to drive with increased caution. In Baja California State, authorities ordered drivers to reduce their speed by 10 percent. Residents living on slopes or areas prone to landslides were advised to carry out a review of their soil and house conditions.

As the eye of Dolores passed just northeast of Socorro Island, an automated weather station on the island recorded sustained hurricane-force winds. The station reported 1-minute sustained winds of 79 mph (128 km/h), with a wind gust of 115 mph (185 km/h). Although the center of Dolores stayed away from mainland Mexico, the proximity of the storm to the country’s southwestern coast allowed rainbands to affect several states. The National Weather Service of Mexico noted that the impact from the rainbands extended to Chiapas, Oaxaca, Morelos, Mexico, Michoacán, Colima, Jalisco, Nayarit, Sinaloa, and Baja California Sur, along with Mexico City. The rainbands occasionally caused heavy rain. Patrolling units from the Civil Protection System in Jalisco removed stones that had fallen onto roads. After the storm, roads in the state were passable. In Baja California State, Dolores dropped heavy rain. The Seguridad Pública del Estado (Secretariat of Public Safety of the State) reported 171 emergency calls, including 140 from the city of Tijuana. On July 19, around 1.5 in (38 mm) of rainfall overwhelmed the city’s drainage system, causing mass flash flooding and property damage. Within 15 minutes, a mudslide damaged at least 300 homes and businesses. News and media reports described the mudslide as an "avalanche". Household items were washed into the streets, and vehicles were swept away. In communities such as Fidel Velasquez and Fraccionamiento El Refugio, floodwaters reached 5.9 ft (1.8 m) high. Around 40 families were evacuated.

In the aftermath of the flooding, researchers at the Department of Urban and Environmental Studies of the Colegio de la Frontera Norte (College of the Northern Frontier) deemed that Tijuana was not prepared to face a rain level similar to the one on July 19. The director of Civil Protection in Baja California, Antonio Rosquillas Navarro, stated that the storm infrastructure is "not worthy of the city". The Secretary of Urban Development in Tijuana blamed the floods on garbage in the streets obstructing the storm drains, preventing them from working at full potential. Media reports partially attributed this to the rapid population growth in Tijuana.

=== United States ===
As a tropical cyclone, Dolores caused rip currents along beaches in Southern California, which claimed the life of one person. Rainfall and thunderstorms were not reported prior to the hurricane becoming post-tropical. A surge of moisture associated with the remnants of the cyclone moved northward, ahead of a trough off the California coast, between July 17 and 18. The interaction of the moisture with the trough caused an outbreak of severe weather and heavy rainfall across California, Arizona, and Nevada. On July 19, the Weather Prediction Center (WPC) issued a slight risk of flash flooding in its Excessive Rainfall Outlook for the western half of Arizona, and parts of California and Utah. The risk was expanded to include much of Southern California and southeastern tip of Nevada later that day. On July 20, the WPC modified the risk, confining it to mainly Southern California. The National Climatic Data Center estimated overall damage in the country to exceed $51.1 million.

==== California ====
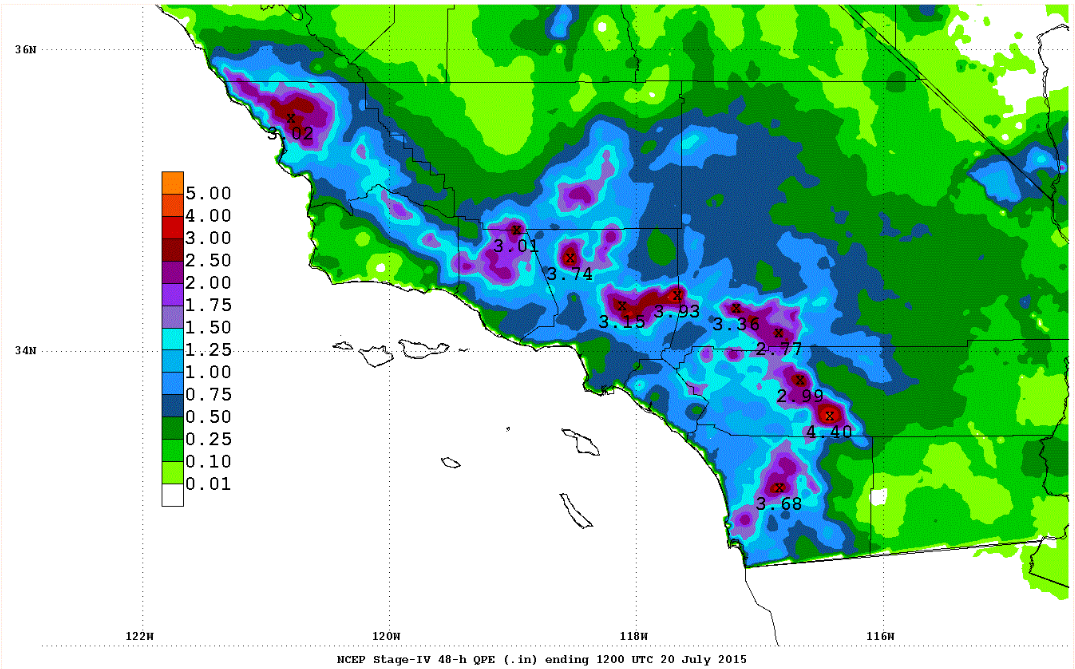
Map showing rainfall from the remnants of Hurricane Dolores in Southern California. The darker the colors in an area, the more rain that fell

Waves of up to 10 ft (3.0 m) were forecast for portions of Southern California, including Huntington Beach Pier in Huntington Beach. Prior to the storm, officials prepared for high waves and rip currents. Newport Beach increased the number of active lifeguards. The National Oceanic and Atmospheric Administration issued warnings discouraging people from going into the water. The Los Angeles County Fire Department Lifeguard Division monitored reports from the National Weather Service, and surfing was prohibited. On the weekend of July 12 to 13, Los Angeles County reported 270 rescues, including 78 at Zuma Beach, where a 28-year-old man drowned from rip currents on July 13.

The remnants of Dolores brought record–breaking rainfall and heavy thunderstorms to Southern California, including major cities such as San Diego and Los Angeles. The National Aeronautics and Space Administration and Japan Aerospace Exploration Agency's Global Precipitation Measurement tool estimated maximum rainfall totals to be over 10.6 in (268 mm). Record monthly rainfall totals include 1.70 in (43 mm) in San Diego, 1.30 in (33 mm) in Los Angeles, and 1.16 in (29.5 mm) in Paso Robles; the record rainfall was mostly attributed to Dolores. In the foothills and mountains of east San Diego County, rainfall exceeded 4 in (100 mm). This rain assisted firefighters in containing the North Fire, but also resulted in debris flows and rock slides that damaged about 90 homes and submerged cars. The San Diego River reached levels of 8.9 ft (2.7 m)—just below flood stage—and overflowed its banks in a few areas. The Los Angeles Angels game against the Boston Red Sox on July 19 was rained out, marking the first occurrence of an Angels game being rained out since 1995. On the same day, the game between the San Diego Padres and the Colorado Rockies was delayed for two-and-a-half hours. Concerts were cancelled in La Mesa, Coronado, and University City. Flash flooding occurred in Moreno Valley, Perris, and La Mesa, while a microburst occurred in Tierrasanta. Swift water rescues were executed near Joshua Tree. Two additional rescues occurred along Lytle Creek. The San Diego Fire-Rescue Department and lifeguards executed a cliff rescue at Black's Beach, saving people stuck on flooded trails. A tour bus was struck by a rock slide in San Bernardino County. A road was blocked near Cleveland National Forest, in San Diego County, due to a mudslide and debris. Tree trunks were washed away in Wrightwood. In Reche Canyon, residents were unable to leave their homes due to flooded roadways. Similarly, in Ramona, residents were unable to evacuate from their homes. Photos on Twitter showed people using rafts.

Views from different angles of the Interstate 10 bridge collapse in Riverside County

Strong winds blew over a semi truck as well as power poles and lines on Interstate 40 near the California-Nevada border, obstructing the road in both directions and causing $75,000 in damage. Mudslides occurred on Interstate 5 in La Jolla and Interstate 805 in Chula Vista. Exit ramps on Interstate 8 were closed throughout the state, and vehicles on the highway were underwater in La Mesa. California Highway Patrol reported numerous vehicles either stalled or submerged along the same highway. Damage from that flood was estimated at $50,000. A portion of State Route 78 southwest of Cibola was washed out, with damage totaling $50,000. Portions of that same highway were flooded near Julian, and flooding was also reported on State Route 79 in North County on July 19. A bridge along Interstate 10 near Desert Center, in Riverside County, was washed out. Hundreds of motorists were stranded, and a truck was stuck after the bridge crumpled. The driver was later rescued by firefighters and sustained moderate injuries. Both the eastbound and westbound lanes of the highway were closed for damage assessments; damage to the bridge was placed at $50 million. The bridge later reopened on September 24. Two other bridges in the vicinity were also damaged. Urban flooding in the Moreno Valley caused more than $100,000. Portions of State Route 60 were impassable. Near the intersection of Interstate 215 and Van Buren Boulevard, eight cars were trapped in high waters. Nearby, at the intersection of Van Buren and 91, many cars were stuck, and mud covered all lanes in parts of Route 91. Damage was estimated at $30,000. Boulders rolled onto State Route 62 in San Bernardino County, causing approximately $15,000 in damage. At the interchange of State Routes 71 and 91, a vehicle was reported stuck in floodwaters; damage totaled $10,000. The San Diego Department of Public Works closed multiple roads in the city. In Yosemite National Park, a rockslide occurred on State Route 140. The road remained closed until July 23. In addition, a severe thunderstorm dropped an accumulation of 4 in (100 mm) of hail on Interstate 80 near Lake Tahoe. All lanes were blocked on Interstate 15 in Cajon due to mudflows. After Dolores passed, the California Department of Transportation inspected 58 bridges, and all were determined safe.

A total of three EF0 landspout tornadoes, which are weak and short-lived tornadoes that do not need a thunderstorm to form, were reported. Social media reports documented two occurrences in San Bernardino County and another in Lassen County; the tornadoes produced no damage. More than 20,000 cloud-to-ground and cloud-to-cloud lightning strikes were recorded by the National Weather Service San Diego. Lightning struck San Diego more than 200 times, according to the National Weather Service. Some of the strikes sparked small bushfires, which were quickly extinguished. In Del Mar, lightning sparked a tree fire. A similar occurrence was reported in Point Loma, where a tree struck by lightning fell on a home. The threat of lightning delayed an Over-the-Line tournament in Mission Bay for 30 minutes on July 18. The National Weather Service warned of a "life-threatening" supercell south of Point Loma, and lifeguards issued alerts and ordered people to take shelter. A transformer was struck by lightning in La Jolla. In Kern County, a 62-year-old man was killed by a lightning strike. In San Bernardino County, a man on a jet ski suffered injuries after lightning struck him. Hail the size of golf balls was recorded in Alpine County, damaging a police vehicle. In Calexico, doppler radar detected hail up to 3.75 in (95 mm) in diameter. A haboob was also recorded in Anza-Borrego Desert State Park. Winds from thunderstorms knocked down trees in Valerie, blocking two streets, and a palm tree was downed on a road in Perris. High winds downed six trees near Montgomery Field in San Diego. Wires were brought down and a power pole was bent in Nuevo. SDG&E reported hundreds of customers without power on July 18 and more than 2,800 customers without power on July 19. About 2,000 of the outages were located in Oceanside, while the others were located in Bonita. After the storm, on July 20, Southern California Edison reported 1,695 customers without power.

Riverside County Supervisor John Benoit considered the flood in Riverside County to be a 1-in-500 year event. Losses in California totaled a little more than $50.48 million.

==== Arizona ====
Overall damage in Arizona was estimated at $648,000.

===== La Paz and Mohave Counties =====
Both La Paz County and Mohave County were affected by severe thunderstorms and flash flooding. Peak rainfall rates were estimated around 2 in (51 mm) per hour. In Parker, law enforcement reported 4 in (100 mm) of water flowing over roadways. A storm spotter near Bouse measured 1 in (25 mm) of rain within only 17 minutes. Central La Paz County was under a Small Stream Flood Advisory on July 18. A wind gust of 54 mph (87 km/h) was observed in a thunderstorm.

On July 18, three boats capsized over Lake Havasu in Mohave County due to rough waters and high winds of 49 mph (79 km/h).All of the passengers on the boats were rescued, though damage to the vessels totaled $60,000. In Bullhead City, several trees were blown down along a highway. A top wind speed of 64 mph (103 km/h) was recorded. At Laughlin/Bullhead International Airport, hail of 0.88 in (2.2 cm) in diameter was recorded. High winds blew over 36 power poles in the Mohave Valley area, causing $400,000 in damage. Over 1,300 people lost power in Bullhead City and Kingman due to lightning. A storm chaser reported rocks and mud washing onto a road near Davis Dam. A street in Walapai was located under 4 ft (1.2 m) of water, and three principal roadways were obstructed due to inundation in Colorado City. Additionally, roads were closed in Yucca and Hackberry. Several roads were inundated in Haviland by a major tributary of the Sacramento Wash. Debris was swept over two intersections in Kingman. Overall damage in Mohave County was estimated at $498,000.

===== Maricopa County =====
Heavy rain caused flash flooding and mudslides near Phoenix. Roads were washed out, and some places were left under 2 ft (0.61 m) of water. Hurricane-force winds of 75 mph (121 km/h) affected the city of Morristown, blowing down 2 mi (3.2 km) of power lines. U.S. Route 60 (US 60) was closed due to the downed lines. Damage from this thunderstorm totaled at least $100,000. Damaging mudslides and flash flooding occurred in Wickenburg. Rainfall rates of more than 3 in (76 mm) per hour lead to peak rainfall amounts of up to 4.5 in (110 mm). US 60 was inundated and undriveable. The Casandro Wash flooded, with a height of 6.7 ft (2.0 m). Flooding also occurred on the Hassayampa River. Wickenburg Airport recorded 3.46 in (88 mm) of rain in 24 hours. Floodwaters washed away and overturned vehicles and destroyed infrastructure. More than 3,000 customers lost power. Photos showed that mud buried grass and roadways. A road in the town was damaged. Mobile homes were engulfed in mud, and cars were stranded. USA Today described footage captured by local news media as "stunning". After the storm, residents in the town began cleanup. People digged up 3 ft (0.91 m) of mud. The Town Manager of Wikenburg, Josh Wright, vowed to work with the Maricopa County Flood District for "in-depth studies" to solve the city's flood problem. The Red Cross opened up a shelter in the town and reported that 10 homes sustained flood damage. A flood plain map created by Maricopa County showed that Wickenburg was at risk for flooding. Some residents called for the local and county governments to install a flood-prevention framework before the flood. However, county officials noted that they had no jurisdiction over maintaining local streams, and Town Manager Wright called on both public and private parties to come up with a solution. Overall damage in Maricopa County was estimated at $150,000.

==== Nevada ====
Heavy rain and thunderstorms were reported near the border with Arizona. In Laughlin, a weather spotter reported winds of 60 mph (97 km/h), and a few roads, including State Route 163, were closed due to flooding. U.S. Route 93 and State Route 168 were inundated near Rox in Lincoln County. The former was also obstructed by rocks and debris near Etna. Dolores also caused a dust storm in the Las Vegas Valley, reducing visibility to near zero. Total damage in Nevada was estimated at $5,000.

== See also ==
- Tropical cyclones in 2015
- List of Category 4 Pacific hurricanes
- Other storms with the same name
- Lists of tropical cyclones by area:
  - List of Baja California hurricanes
  - List of Arizona hurricanes
  - List of California hurricanes
- Hurricane Kathleen (1976)
- Hurricane Doreen (1977)
- Hurricane Darby (1992)
- Hurricane Nora (1997)
- Hurricane Norbert (2014)
- Hurricane Odile (2014)
- Hurricane Linda (2015)
- Hurricane Rosa (2018)
- Hurricane Genevieve (2020)
- Hurricane Kay (2022) – Took an identical track, and its remnants brought rain to some parts of Southern California.
- Hurricane Hilary (2023) – Caused similar impacts to California as a remnant low.
- Hurricane Marie (2026) – Took similar to identical track to Dolores, and had outer bands of rain in Southern California.
