= Hurricane Kay (2022) =

Category 2 Pacific hurricane in 2022

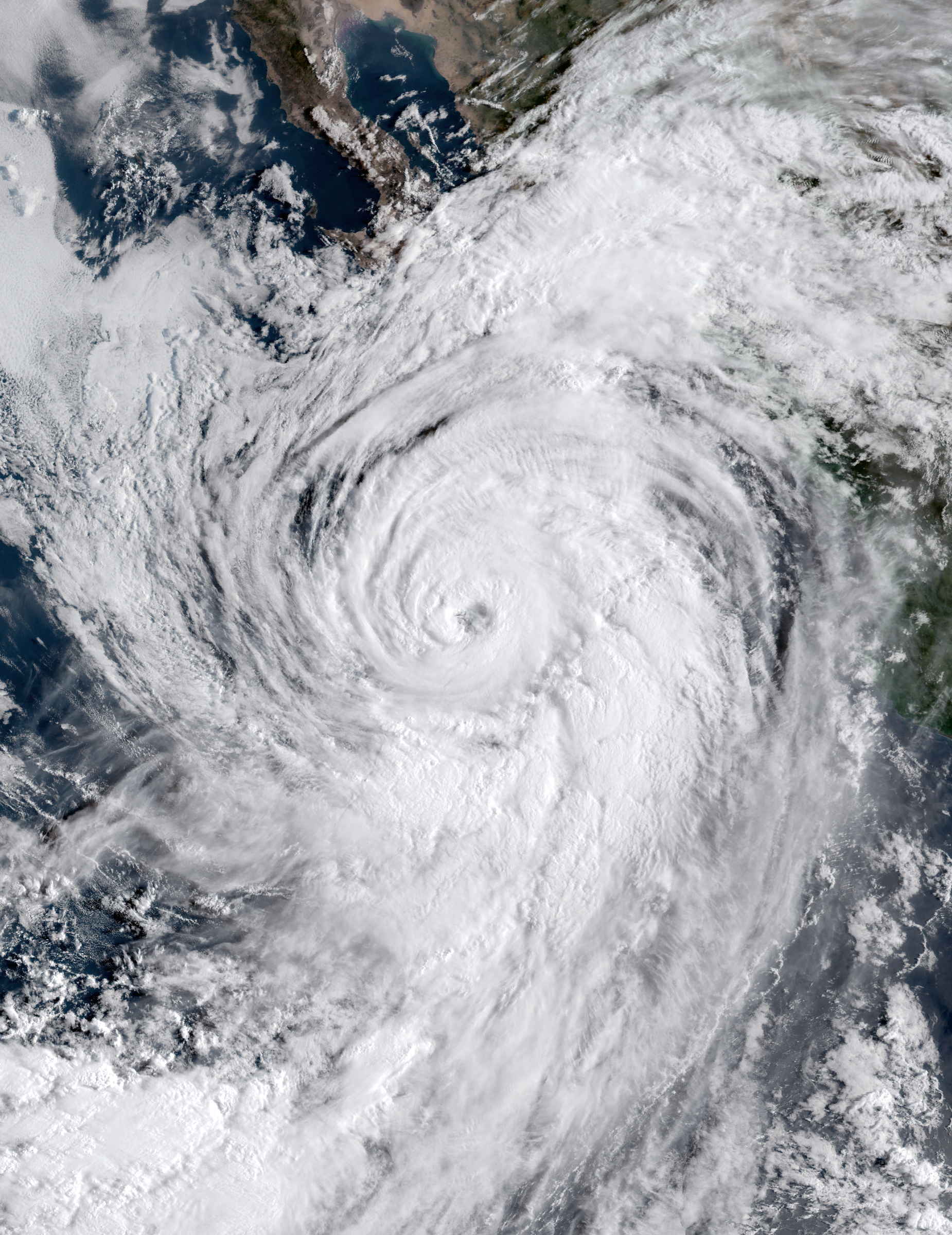
- Hurricane Kay at peak intensity on September 7.

Meteorological history
- Formed: September 4, 2022
- Remnant low: September 9, 2022
- Dissipated: September 13, 2022

Category 2 hurricane
- 1-minute sustained (SSHWS/NWS)
- Highest winds: 100 mph (155 km/h)
- Lowest pressure: 968 mbar (hPa); 28.59 inHg

Overall effects
- Fatalities: 6 total
- Damage: $63.5 million (2022 USD)
- Areas affected: Southwestern Mexico, Baja California Peninsula, Southwestern United States
- IBTrACS /
- Part of the 2022 Pacific hurricane season

Hurricane Kay was a Category 2 hurricane that made landfall along the Pacific coast of the Baja California peninsula as a tropical storm. The twelfth named storm and eighth hurricane of the 2022 Pacific hurricane season, Kay originated from an area of disturbed weather that formed south of southern Mexico. Overall, damage from Kay totalled $63.5 million (2022 USD) and it was responsible for five fatalities. Rain from the storm proved beneficial for firefighters battling the Fairview Fire in Southern California.

== Meteorological history ==
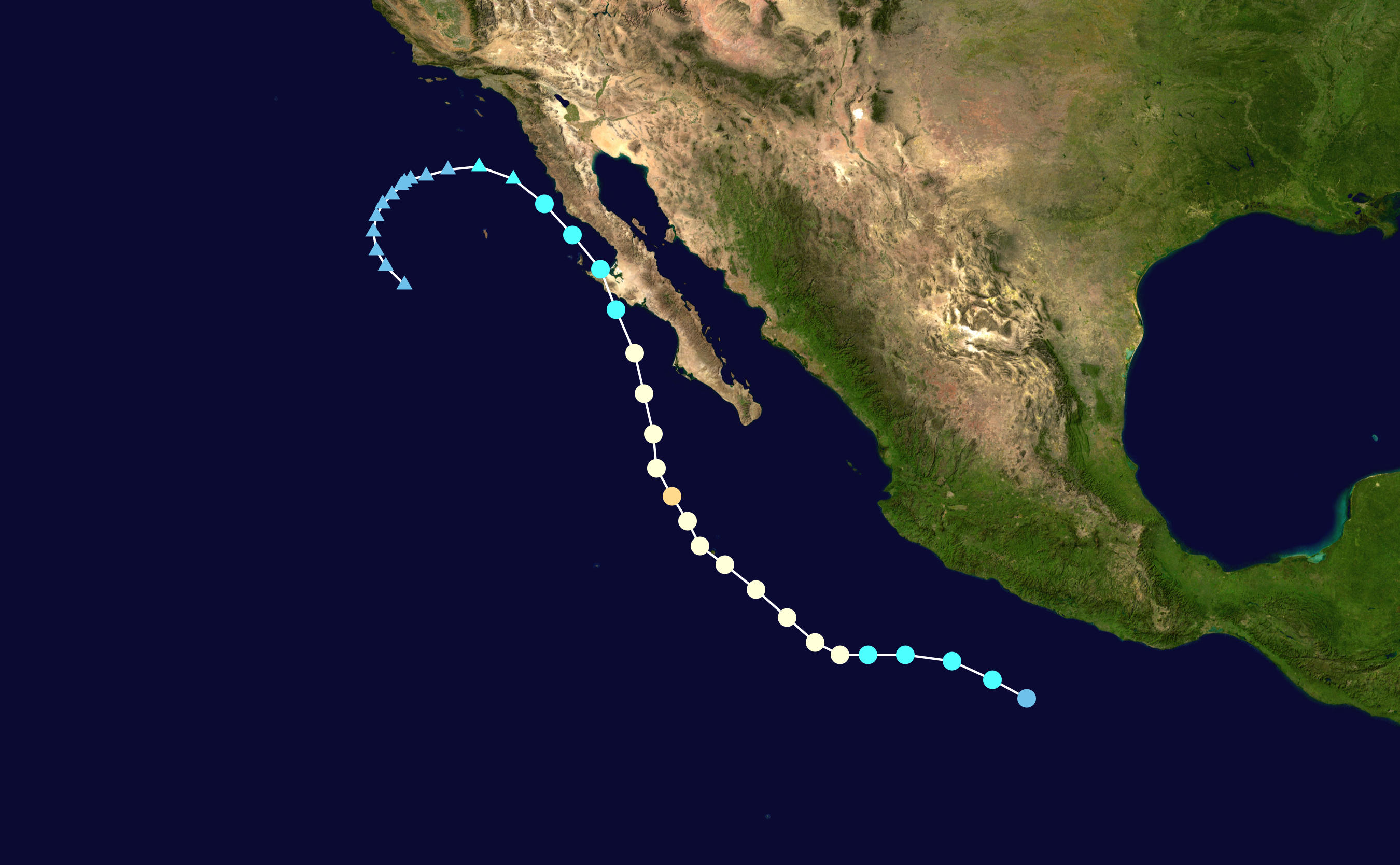
Map plotting the storm's track and intensity, according to the Saffir–Simpson scale Map key Saffir–Simpson scale Tropical depression (≤38 mph, ≤62 km/h) Tropical storm (39–73 mph, 63–118 km/h) Category 1 (74–95 mph, 119–153 km/h) Category 2 (96–110 mph, 154–177 km/h) Category 3 (111–129 mph, 178–208 km/h) Category 4 (130–156 mph, 209–251 km/h) Category 5 (≥157 mph, ≥252 km/h) Unknown Storm type Tropical cyclone Subtropical cyclone Extratropical cyclone, remnant low, tropical disturbance, or monsoon depression

On August 29, the National Hurricane Center located two areas of disturbed thunderstorms that had formed south of Mexico. While one of the areas intensified quickly, becoming Tropical Storm Javier, while the other slowly intensified, organizing itself slower than Javier. By September 3, the NHC had given the area a 90% chance of forming. The next day, the area organized itself, strengthening into Tropical Depression Twelve at 05:00. By 11:00 on September 4, the depression had strengthened into Tropical Storm Kay. Kay continued organizing and intensifying, resulting in Kay strengthening into a Category 1 hurricane only one day after becoming a tropical storm. On September 6, the eye of Kay passed over Socorro Island with winds of around 85 mph (137 km/h). Kay continued intensifying, becoming a Category 2 hurricane as it moved northwestward towards Baja California. As Kay neared landfall in Baja California Sur, Kay stopped intensifying and organization and convection within Kay minimalized itself, resulting in Kay weakening back into a Category 1 hurricane on September 7. The day after weakening into a Category 1 hurricane, Kay made landfall in the western central Baja California peninsula with winds of around 75 mph (121 km/h). Shortly after landfall, Kay weakened into a tropical storm, before beginning to move northward as it passed by Cedros Island. As Kay moved northward, it transitioned into a post-tropical cyclone overnight 9–10, not far southwest from San Diego, California. Kay made a sudden turn southward and began moving south, though by September 11, Kay had completely dissipated after losing its identity.

== Preparations and impact ==
=== Mexico ===
From September 4 to 9, Hurricane Kay's expansive rainbands brought rainfall to a cumulative 16 states across Mexico. Precipitation progressed from southern states, such as Oaxaca and Guerrero, to Baja California in the northwest portion of the nation. Maximum daily rainfall totals in Guerrero and Jalisco reached 140 and 135.4 mm (5.51 and 5.33 in), respectively, on September 4. Rainfall was most significant across the Baja California Peninsula, with three-day totals reaching 383 mm (15.1 in) in Guadeloupe and 370 mm (14.6 in) in Sierra de San Francisco. The majority of these totals fell within 24-hour spans. The storm struck Socorro Island on September 6, bringing 154 mm (6.1 in) of rain that day. In addition to flooding, landslides, and falling trees, the hurricane was also responsible for three deaths in Guerrero. Kay also damaged most of the Baja California peninsula with strong winds and heavy rain, which caused much flooding and mudslides, though there were no reports of injuries. Shortly before the storm hit, over 1,600 people evacuated to shelters according to Baja California Sur state officials. Four people were killed in Mexico, and the government reported a damage of 1.04 billion pesos (US$52 million).

=== United States ===
Moisture associated with Hurricane Kay brought widespread heavy rain, flash floods, and damaging winds to the Southwestern United States. The National Centers for Environmental Information tabulated $11.5 million in damage across four states in relation to the storm with the majority incurred by California. A mudflow in Southern California claimed the life of one person.

==== California ====
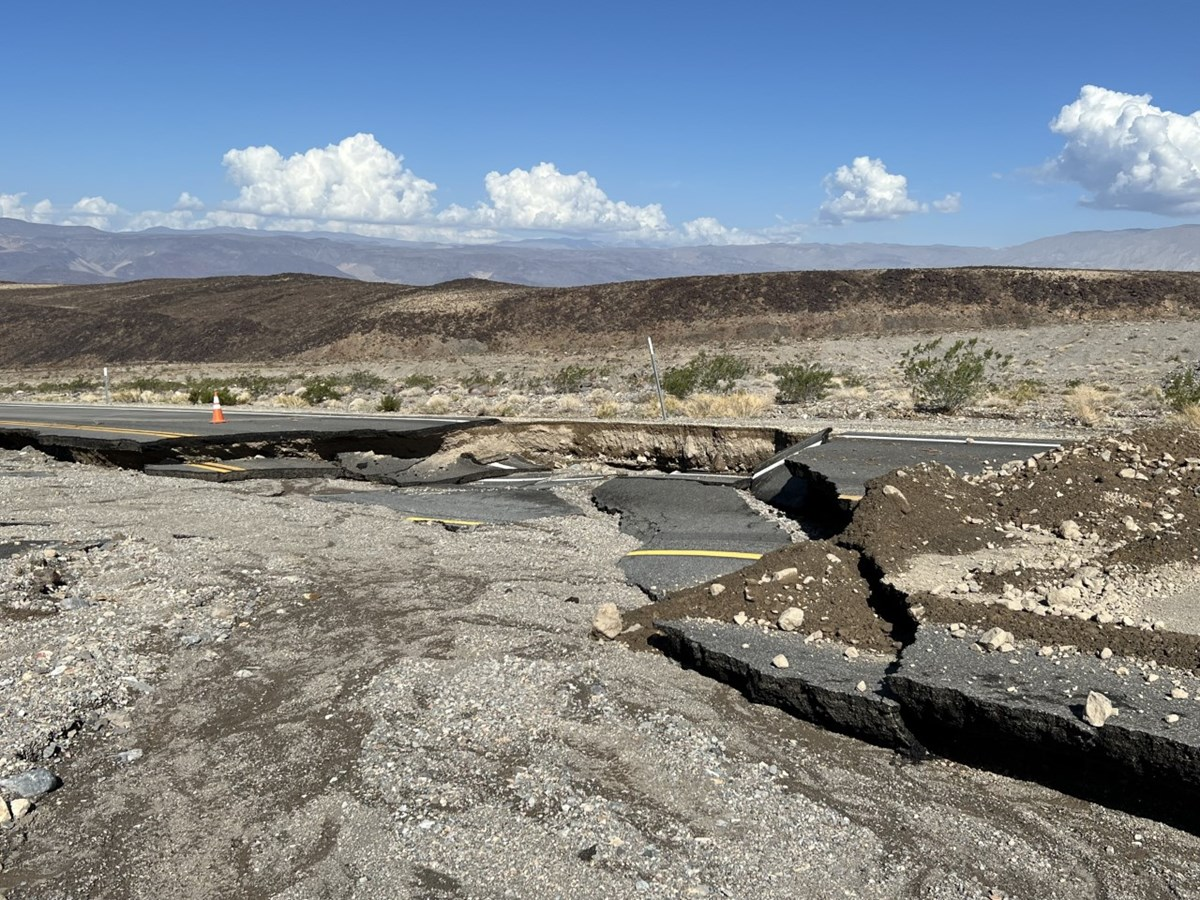
Flash floods in Death Valley National Park washed out portions of Highway CA-190

Abundant moisture associated with the remnants of Kay led to scattered showers and thunderstorms in the Southwestern United States, particularly in California. Rainfall totals varied across the regions, with Mt. Laguna recording the highest rainfall amount of around 5 in (130 mm). In Imperial County, California, falling boulders created traffic along an area of I-8. Los Angeles set records for both a daily rainfall of 0.2 in (5.1 mm) as well as a daily heat record of 102 °F (39 °C) as Kay moved through on September 9. Localized flooding in Death Valley National Park covered several roads, including a 6 mi (9.7 km) stretch of road in Badwater Basin. A section of Route 190 was washed out near Towne Pass. A bus became stuck in softened sand near this location, briefly stranding motorists. A Major League Baseball game between the San Diego Padres and the Los Angeles Dodgers was delayed due to the rain.

The rainfall was beneficial to crews battling the Fairview Fire in Riverside County: the wildfire had burned more than 25,000 acres (100 km^{2}) and had led to the evacuation of nearly 24,000 people, prompted by the fear that the storm's 70 mph (110 km/h) winds would spread the fire. Instead, rain and increased humidity allowed crews to increase containment of the fire from 5% to 40%. This mitigated the risk to an estimated 18,000 homes.

On September 12, mudflows affected several communities in the San Bernardino Mountains. A total of 2.4 in (61 mm) of rain fell within an hour over burn scars from the Apple and El Dorado fires. A series of flows impacted multiple valleys in Forest Falls, resulting in a cascade of water, mud, and debris. Initial evacuation orders were rescinded as travel became impossible. One person was killed when her home was crushed by debris. A team of 120 personnel from various rescue departments were dispatched to search through mud piled 6 ft (1.8 m) deep for the killed person for several days. Heavy machinery and cadaver dogs were used throughout the search. A total of six homes were destroyed in Forest Falls, two in Oak Glen, 22 other homes were otherwise damaged, and one business was severely damaged. Approximately 3,000 people were affected in the region.

Powerful winds accompanied the storm's rainfall, particularly in San Diego County, reaching a maximum of 109 mph (175 km/h) at Cuyamaca Peak. Power outages affected tens of thousands across the Los Angeles Metro, though these generally lasted only a few hours. Gale and surf warnings covered the southwestern counties of California, with officials in Long Beach providing sandbags to residents. Temporary berms were constructed in Alamitos Beach to protect coastal homes. Severe beach erosion occurred in Southern California, with some coasts in the Los Angeles area losing 5 ft (1.5 m) of sand vertically.

On September 16, California Governor Gavin Newsom declared a state of emergency for Imperial, Inyo, Los Angeles, Riverside, and San Bernardino counties owing to damage caused by Kay.

==== Elsewhere ====
Described as an "unusual setup" for Utah in particular, the National Weather Service issued slight and moderate flood-risk outlooks alongside flash flood watches for the aforementioned state along with Arizona, Nevada, and New Mexico. This rain followed deadly floods in the region just a month prior during one of the wettest monsoon seasons on record. In Nevada, wind gusts associated with storms reached 62 mph (100 km/h) near Gold Hill. Heavy rain across the Mojave Desert caused scattered flash floods. In Overton, Nevada, 1.89 in (48 mm) of rain fell, including 0.8 in (20 mm) in 20 minutes. This inundated roads in several parks and left vehicles stranded across Valley of Fire State Park. Flood-related damage across the state was tabulated at $167,000. Extensive flooding occurred in Mohave County, Arizona, along the border with Nevada, forcing the closure of multiple roads. In just under two hours, 3.86 in (98 mm) of rain fell in Getz which triggered flash floods. This inundated up to ten homes and necessitated eight water rescues in the community. Another swift water rescue was performed along Oatman Highway. Damage in Arizona reached $139,500. In New Mexico, north-to-south propagating thunderstorms brought heavy rain and strong winds to the northern mountains. A peak gust of 67 mph (108 km/h) was observed near Stanley. A nearly stationary thunderstorm produced over 2 in (51 mm) of rain over areas recently burned by the Calf Canyon fire in El Porvenir. The Beaver and Gallinas creeks flooded along Highway 65, leaving behind debris on the roads and inundating nearby homes. Another storm similarly affected areas within the McBride Fire burn scar in Lincoln County. Damage across New Mexico reached $220,000.

== See also ==
- Other storms of the same name
- Weather of 2022
- Tropical cyclones in 2022
- Timeline of the 2022 Pacific hurricane season
- Hurricane Kathleen (1976) – Took similar to the areas in Southern California, as a post-tropical cyclone
- Hurricane Olivia (1982) – Caused similar impacts to California as a remnant low
- Hurricane Dolores (2015) – Caused similar impacts to California as a remnant low
- Hurricane Hilary (2023) – took a similar track to Kay for much of its life, continuing north from the general area where Kay's remnants turned west
