= List of storms named Kay =

The name Kay has been used for seven tropical cyclones in the Eastern Pacific Ocean, one in the Australian region and for in the South-West Indian Ocean.

In the Eastern Pacific:

- Hurricane Kay (1980) – Category 4 hurricane that tracked along an irregular but generally west-northwest path out to sea.
- Tropical Storm Kay (1986)
- Tropical Storm Kay (1992)
- Hurricane Kay (1998) – a Category 1 hurricane that churned in the open ocean.
- Tropical Storm Kay (2004)
- Tropical Storm Kay (2016)
- Hurricane Kay (2022) – a Category 2 hurricane that made landfall in Baja California as a tropical storm.

In the Australian region:

- Cyclone Kay (1987) – impacted Papua New Guinea and Western Australia.

In the South-West Indian Ocean:

- Cyclone Kay (1966) – a strong tropical cyclone mostly stayed at sea.
