= North Fire (2015) =

2015 wildfire in Southern California

- Part of the 2015 California wildfires
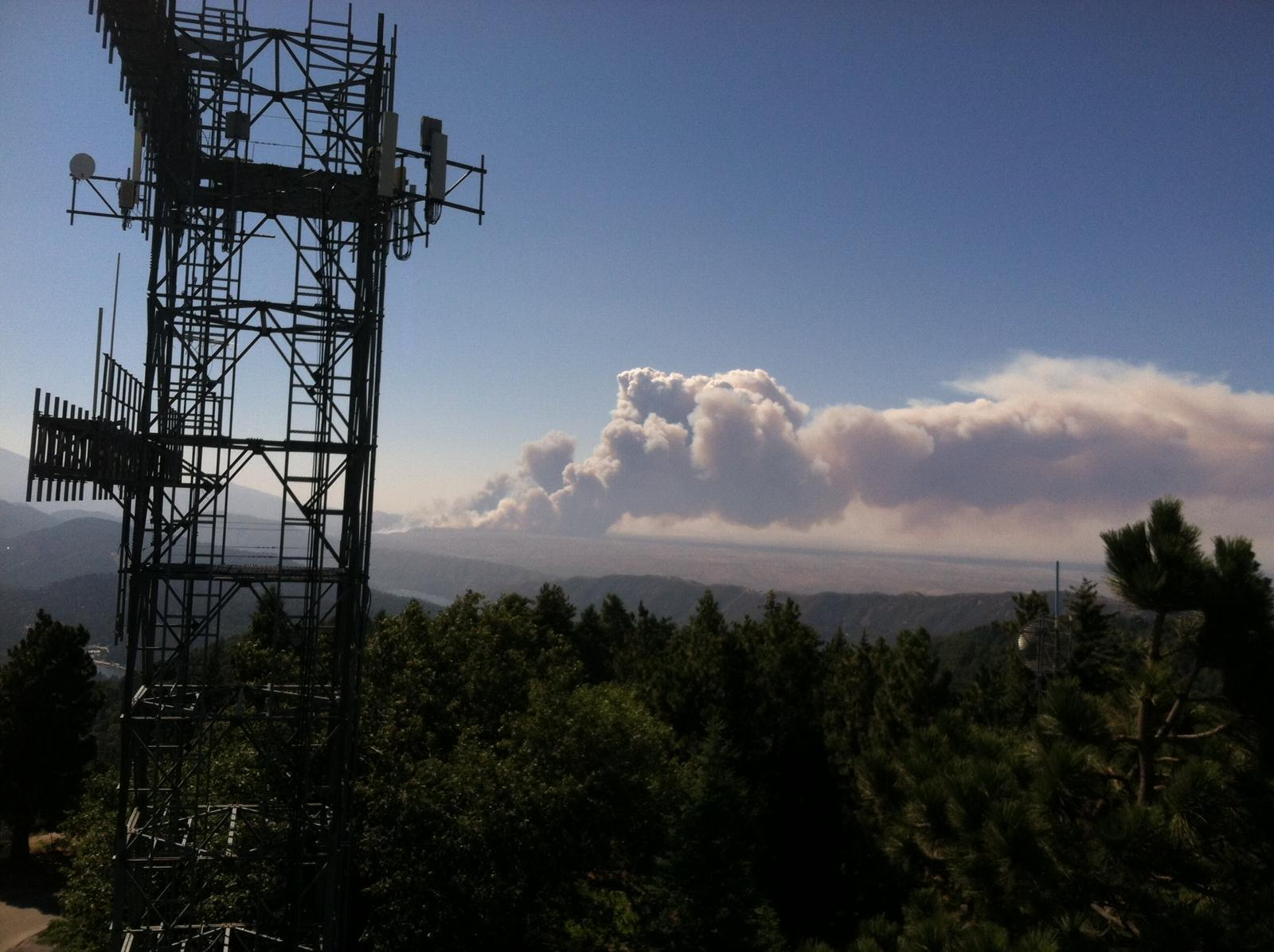
- Date: July 17, 2015 –; July 21, 2015
- Location: Near Victorville, San Bernardino County, California
- Coordinates: 34.339°N 117.478°W

Statistics
- Burned area: 4,250 acres (17 km^{2})

Impacts
- Injuries: 3
- Structures lost: 7 homes; 16 outbuildings; 74 vehicles

Map
- Location within southern California

The North Fire was a wildfire that occurred in the Mojave Desert near the towns of Victorville and Hesperia, north of San Bernardino and south of Bakersfield, California. The fire began on July 17, 2015. The areas most impacted were adjacent to Interstate 15, where the Cajon Pass passes through the San Bernardino National Forest. The fire spread to 4,250 acres, and burned homes and other buildings, as well as numerous vehicles stranded on the interstate. Seventy-four passenger vehicles and trucks were burned along the highway or in neighboring communities due to the fire. The fire closed Interstate 15, the main highway connecting Southern California with Las Vegas, Nevada, during the first day of the blaze.

One-thousand fire fighters battled the blaze during the height of the fire, which as of the evening of July 17 was five percent contained. Mandatory evacuations were ordered for the towns of Phelan and Baldy Mesa, which were threatened or impacted by the fire. Two-hundred-four people utilized an emergency shelter set up at Serrano High School, in Phelan. The evacuation orders were lifted as crews worked to contain the fire. On the evening of July 18, the fire was reported to be 45% contained, after a rain storm from the remnant moisture of Hurricane Dolores brought cooler temperatures to the chaparral fueled fire. By the following morning, the fire was reported to be 60% contained. On Monday, July 20, the fire was reported to be 75% contained, but had also grown from 3,500 to 4,250 acres. The fire was fully contained on July 21, and fire fighters remained on scene to douse hot spots in the burn area. The remnants of Hurricane Dolores assisted with putting the fire out by drenching the area the same weekend, while causing other damage in Southern California.

The presence of unmanned aerial vehicles (UAVs/drones) in the area that interfered with fire fighting efforts has renewed discussion of legislation to limit the operation of drones in the United States. In response to the drone activity over active wildfires, San Bernardino County, the California State Legislature and the Congress of the United States have all proposed restrictions on privately owned drones.

== Fire fighting complications ==
Efforts at fire suppression were complicated by the presence of drones (UAVs) in the air space being used by fire-fighting helicopters and airplanes, and by a shooting at the command center.

On Sunday, July 19, aerial suppression of the fire was temporarily halted by the presence of drones flying in the vicinity. Three of the five drones found in the area left the scene, but the presence of two others interfered with the fire fighting operation. After a delay, the fire fighting operation resumed.

On Monday, July 20, a US Forest Service officer fired his weapon outside the headquarters of the fire fighting effort, located at the fair grounds in Victorville. A man allegedly became "uncooperative" and tried to flee, dragging the officer with his car. The officer fired several rounds into the vehicle, but there were no injuries.

== Impact ==
United States Representative Paul Cook, Republican-Yucca Valley, introduced legislation known as the Wildfire Airspace Protection Act of 2015, (H.R. 3025) one week prior to the North Fire which would make it a federal offense to fly a UAV in a manner that interferes with fire fighters in the vicinity of a wildfire on federal lands. The legislation has garnered renewed interest in the aftermath of the North Fire.

The San Bernardino County Board of Supervisors discussed UAV activity in the county at its meeting on July 28, 2015. Prior to the meeting, Board Chairman James Ramos stated, regarding UAVs in the area of fire fighting operations, "When you are inhibiting the response of the first responders, then you infringe on the safety of the residents of San Bernardino County." At the meeting, the county approved monetary rewards of US$25,000 for each incident for information leading to the arrest of individuals who piloted UAVs over recent wildfires in the county.

Both houses of the California State Legislature have either introduced legislation or otherwise acted regarding UAVs operating over state wildfires. Senate Bill 168 would give immunity to first responders who damage or destroy privately owned UAVs operating over wildfires. And some members of the California House of Representatives are urging the Federal Aviation Administration to consider geo fencing of commercially available UAVs, which could be used by authorities to keep them out of restricted areas.

In October, 2015, the US Federal Aviation Administration announced that UAVs flying within the United States must register their aircraft with the federal government. This new policy will apply to both new vehicles, as well as UAVs already owned and operated. The new policy imposes penalties on UAV owners who do not comply.

== Cause ==
Authorities have not determined the cause of the fire. The first call firefighters received was of a vehicle in flames on Interstate 15.
