= St. Cloud Rox =

St. Cloud Rox may refer to:

- St. Cloud Rox (minor league baseball), a professional baseball team that operated in St. Cloud, Minnesota, from 1946 to 1971
- St. Cloud Rox (collegiate summer baseball), an amateur baseball team that has operated in St. Cloud, Minnesota, since 1997

== See also ==
- Rox (disambiguation)
