= List of storms named Genevieve =

The name Genevieve has been used for eight tropical cyclones in the Eastern Pacific Ocean and for one in the South-West Indian Ocean.

In the Eastern Pacific:

- Hurricane Genevieve (1984) – a Category 3 hurricane that passed offshore Mexico and dissipated near the southern tip of the Baja California Peninsula
- Hurricane Genevieve (1990) – a Category 2 hurricane, no effect on land
- Tropical Storm Genevieve (1996) – long-lived tropical storm, no effect on land
- Tropical Storm Genevieve (2002) – strong tropical storm, no effect on land
- Hurricane Genevieve (2008) – minimal Category 1, no effect on land
- Hurricane Genevieve (2014) (T1413, 07E) – a long-lasting tropical cyclone crossing all three North Pacific basins; reached Category 3 intensity within the central Pacific basin and Category 5 intensity in the western Pacific, also classified as a violent typhoon
- Hurricane Genevieve (2020) – a powerful Category 4 hurricane that affected the southern tip of the Baja California Peninsula
- Hurricane Genevieve (2026) – a Category 5 hurricane that remained in the open ocean

In the South-West Indian:

- Cyclone Genevieve (1970) – a strong tropical cyclone which affected Madagascar.
