= Rox, Nevada =

- Ghost town
- Location within Nevada Location within the United States
- Coordinates: 36°52′51″N 114°40′02″W
- Country: United States
- State: Nevada
- County: Lincoln
- Elevation: 1,913 ft (583 m)

Rox is an extinct town in Lincoln County, in the U.S. state of Nevada.

== History ==
The first settlement at Rox was made about 1902. A post office was established at Rox in 1921, and remained in operation until 1949. The community was named from the rocky condition of the original town site.
