= 2002 Pacific typhoon season =

Typhoon season in the Pacific

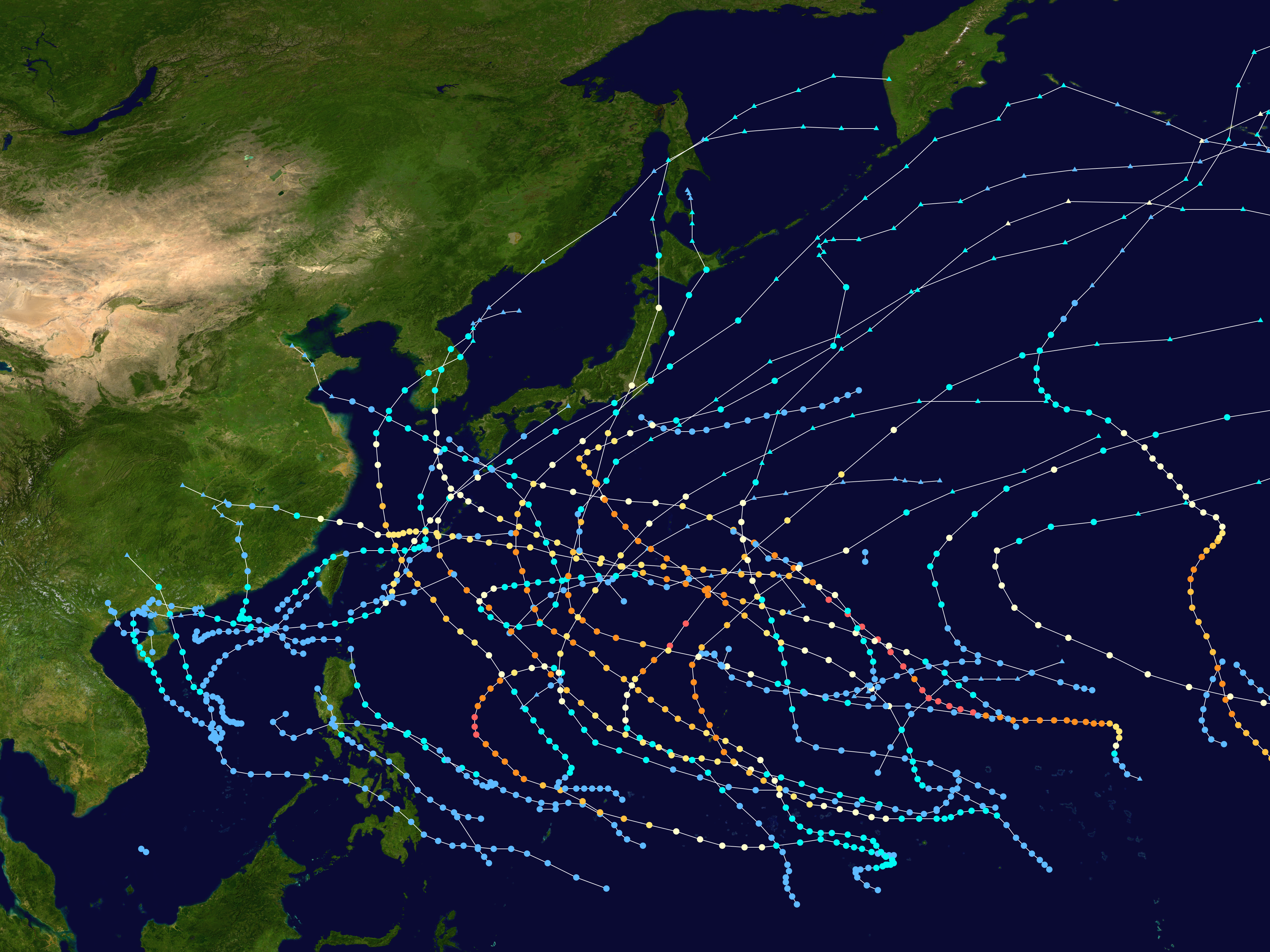
- Season summary map

Seasonal boundaries
- First system formed: January 9, 2002
- Last system dissipated: December 11, 2002

Strongest storm
- Name: Fengshen
  - Maximum winds: 185 km/h (115 mph) (10-minute sustained)
  - Lowest pressure: 920 hPa (mbar)

Seasonal statistics
- Total depressions: 43, 1 unofficial
- Total storms: 26
- Typhoons: 15
- Very strong typhoons: 11
- Violent typhoons: 0
- ACE: 390.6
- Total fatalities: 725 total
- Total damage: $9.53 billion (2002 USD)

Related articles
- 2002 Atlantic hurricane season; 2002 Pacific hurricane season; 2002 North Indian Ocean cyclone season

The 2002 Pacific typhoon season was a slightly above average Pacific typhoon season, producing twenty-six named storms, with fifteen becoming typhoons, and eight intensifying into super typhoons. It was an event in the annual cycle of tropical cyclone formation, in which tropical cyclones form in the western Pacific Ocean. The season ran throughout 2002, though most tropical cyclones typically develop between May and November. The season's first named storm, Tapah, developed on January 11, while the season's last named storm, Pongsona, dissipated on December 11. The season's first typhoon, Mitag, reached typhoon status on March 1, and became the first super typhoon of the year four days later. (Note: A super typhoon is an unofficial category used by the Joint Typhoon Warning Center (JTWC) for a typhoon with winds of at least 240 km/h (150 mph).)

The scope of this article is limited to the Pacific Ocean to the north of the equator between 100°E and the 180th meridian. Within the northwestern Pacific Ocean, there are two agencies which assign names to tropical cyclones which can often result in a cyclone having two names. The Japan Meteorological Agency (JMA) (Note: The Japan Meteorological Agency is the official Regional Specialized Meteorological Center for the western Pacific Ocean.) will name a tropical cyclone if it has 10-minute sustained wind speeds of at least 65 km/h (40 mph) anywhere in the basin, while the Philippine Atmospheric, Geophysical and Astronomical Services Administration (PAGASA) assigns names to tropical cyclones which are active in the Philippine Area of Responsibility (PAR), located between 135°E-115°E and between 5°N–25°N, regardless of whether or not a tropical cyclone has already been given a name by the JMA. Tropical depressions that are monitored by the United States' Joint Typhoon Warning Center (JTWC) (Note: The Joint Typhoon Warning Center is a joint United States Navy – United States Air Force task force that issues tropical cyclone warnings for the western Pacific Ocean and other regions.) are given a number with a "W" suffix.

== Seasonal forecasts ==
TSR forecasts Date	Tropical storms	Total Typhoons	Intense TCs	Ref
Average (1972–2001)	26.3	16.4	7.9	
March 6, 2002	28.6	18.7	9.6	
April 5, 2002	29.6	19.8	9.8	
May 7, 2002	30.5	20.9	10.3	
June 7, 2002	30.8	21.1	10.5	
July 11, 2002	28.6	19.2	11.8	
August 6, 2002	28.4	19.0	11.5	
Other forecasts Date	Forecast Center	Tropical storms	Typhoons	Ref
May 7, 2002	Chan	27	17	
June 28, 2002	Chan	27	18	
2002 season	Forecast Center	Tropical cyclones	Tropical storms	Typhoons
Actual activity:	JMA	43	26	15
Actual activity:	JTWC	33	26	17
Actual activity:	PAGASA	13	10	5

On March 6, meteorologists from University College London at Tropical Storm Risk issued a forecast for above-average activity during the season, citing slightly warmer-than-usual sea surface temperatures. The group used data from the JTWC and compared their projection of 28.6 storms with the 30-year average of 26.3. They raised the prediction to 29.6 storms in April, and again to 30.5 in early May. Ultimately, they overestimated the number of storms. The Laboratory for Atmospheric Research at the City University of Hong Kong also issued a season forecast in April 2002, predicting 27 storms with a margin of error of 3, of which 11 would become typhoons, with a margin of error of 2. The agency cited a stronger-than-normal subtropical ridge over the Pacific Ocean and ongoing El Niño conditions as factors favoring development, but anticipated below-normal activity in the South China Sea. These predictions proved to be largely accurate.

During the year, the JMA issued advisories on tropical cyclones west of the antimeridian to the Malay Peninsula, and north of the equator, in its role as the official Regional Specialized Meteorological Center, a designation it received from the World Meteorological Organization in 1989. The JMA produced forecasts and analyses every six hours, beginning at 00:00 UTC, using numerical weather prediction (NWP) models and a climatological tropical cyclone forecast model. They also applied the Dvorak technique with NWP to estimate 10-minute sustained winds and barometric pressure. The JTWC issued warnings for storms within the basin as well, operating from Pearl Harbor in Hawaii and supplying forecasts to the United States Armed Forces in the Indian and Pacific Oceans. In 2002, the agency moved its backup facility from Yokosuka, Japan to Monterey, California. Several meteorologists departed the agency near the start of the year, though new forecasters compensated for their inexperience by relying on consensus among various forecast models. That year, the JTWC also began experimenting with five-day forecasts.

== Season summary ==
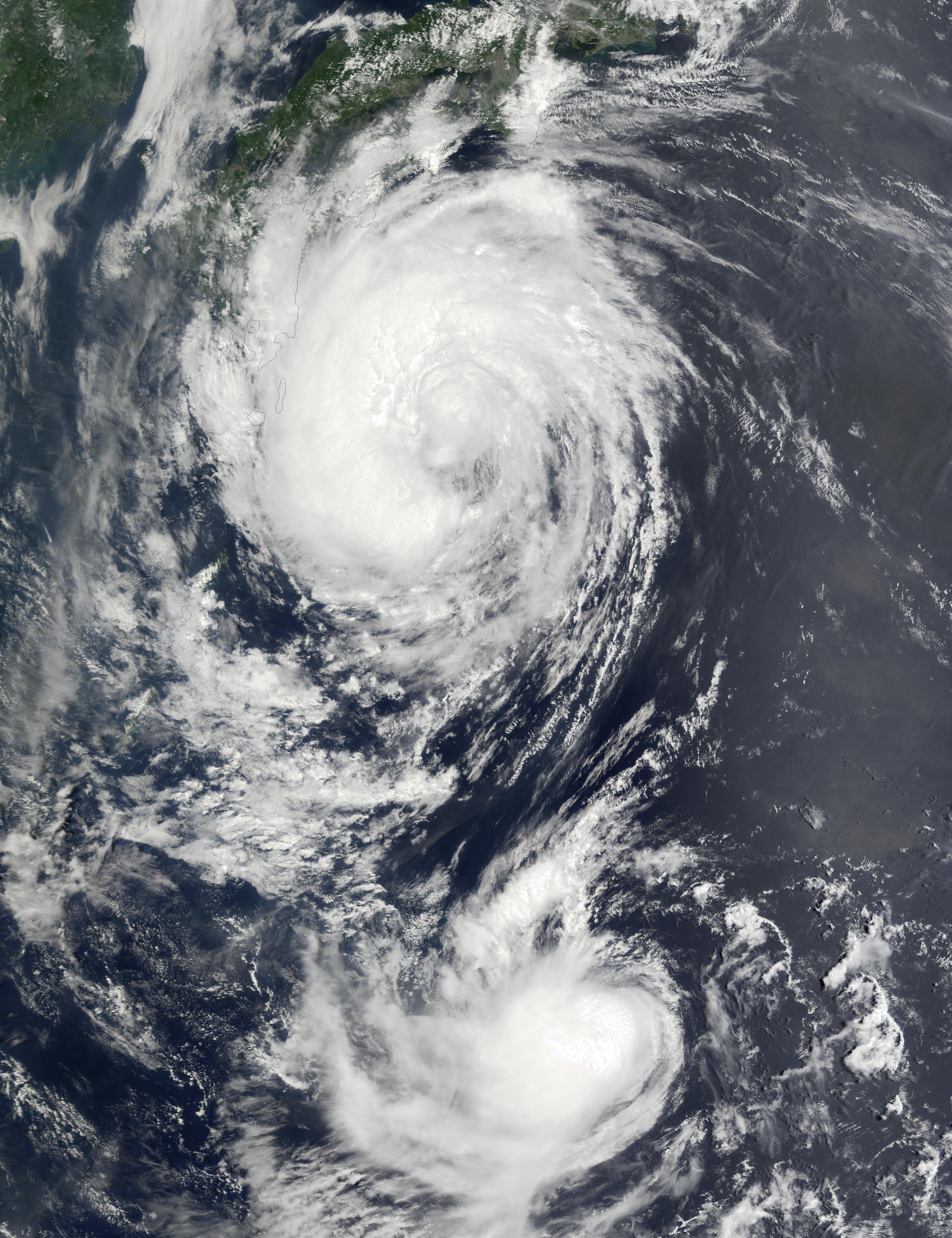
Typhoons Fengshen (north) and Fung-wong (south) underwent the Fujiwhara effect on July 25, 2002

The season was active, with many tropical cyclones affecting Japan and China. Every month had tropical activity, with most storms forming from July through October. Overall, there were 44 tropical depressions declared officially or unofficially, of which 26 became named storms. Of those, 15 became typhoons, equivalent to a minimal hurricane, while 8 of the 15 typhoons intensified into super typhoons unofficially according to the JTWC. The season began early with the first storm, Tapah, developing on January 10 east of the Philippines. Two months later, Typhoon Mitag became the first super typhoon ever recorded in March. In June, Typhoon Chataan dropped heavy rainfall in the Federated States of Micronesia, killing 48 people and becoming the deadliest natural disaster in the state of Chuuk. Chataan later caused extensive damage in Guam before striking Japan. In August, Typhoon Rusa became the deadliest typhoon in South Korea in 43 years, causing 238 deaths and $4.2 billion in damage. (Note: All currency values are given in 2002 figures and in United States dollars, unless otherwise noted.) Typhoon Higos in October was the fifth-strongest typhoon to strike Tokyo since World War II. The final typhoon of the season was Typhoon Pongsona, which was one of the costliest storms on record in Guam; it caused $700 million in damage on the island before dissipating on December 11.

Despite an early beginning, widespread activity did not occur until June, when six storms passed near or over Japan after a ridge weakened. Nine storms developed in July, many of which influenced the monsoon trough over the Philippines that produced heavy rainfall and deadly flooding. The flooding was worst in Luzon, where 85 people were killed. The series of storms caused widespread closures of schools and offices. Many roads were damaged, and the floods caused about $1.8 million (₱94.2 million) (Note: The total was originally reported in Philippine pesos. Total converted via the Oanda Corporation website.) in crop losses, largely to rice and corn. Overall damage from the series of storms was estimated at $10.3 million (₱522 million). From June to September, heavy rainfall affected large portions of China, resulting in devastating flooding that killed over 1,500 people and left $8.2 billion (CN¥68 billion) in damage. (Note: The total was originally reported in Chinese yuan. Total converted via the Oanda Corporation's website.) During this time, Tropical Storm Kammuri struck southern China with a large area of rainfall that damaged or destroyed 245,000 houses. A total of 153 deaths were connected to the storm, mostly inland in Hunan, and damage totaled $322 million (CN¥2.665 billion). Activity shifted farther east after September, with Typhoon Higos striking Japan in October and Typhoon Pongsona hitting Guam in December.

During most of the year, sea surface temperatures were above normal near the equator, and were highest around 160°E from January to July, and in November. Areas of convection developed farther east than usual, causing many storms to develop east of 150°E. The average point of formation was 145.9°E, the easternmost point since 1951. As a result, no tropical storms made landfall in the Philippines, the first such occrrence since 1951, according to the JMA. Two hurricanes – Ele and Huko – entered the basin from the Central Pacific, east of the International Date Line. Overall, there were 26 named storms in the basin in 2002, which was slightly below the norm of 26.7. A total of 15 of the 26 storms became typhoons, a slightly higher-than-normal proportion.

The ACE index for the 2002 Pacific typhoon season, as calculated by Colorado State University using data from the JTWC, was 390.6 units.

== Systems ==
=== Tropical Storm Tapah (Agaton) ===
- Tropical storm (JMA)
- Tropical storm (SSHWS)
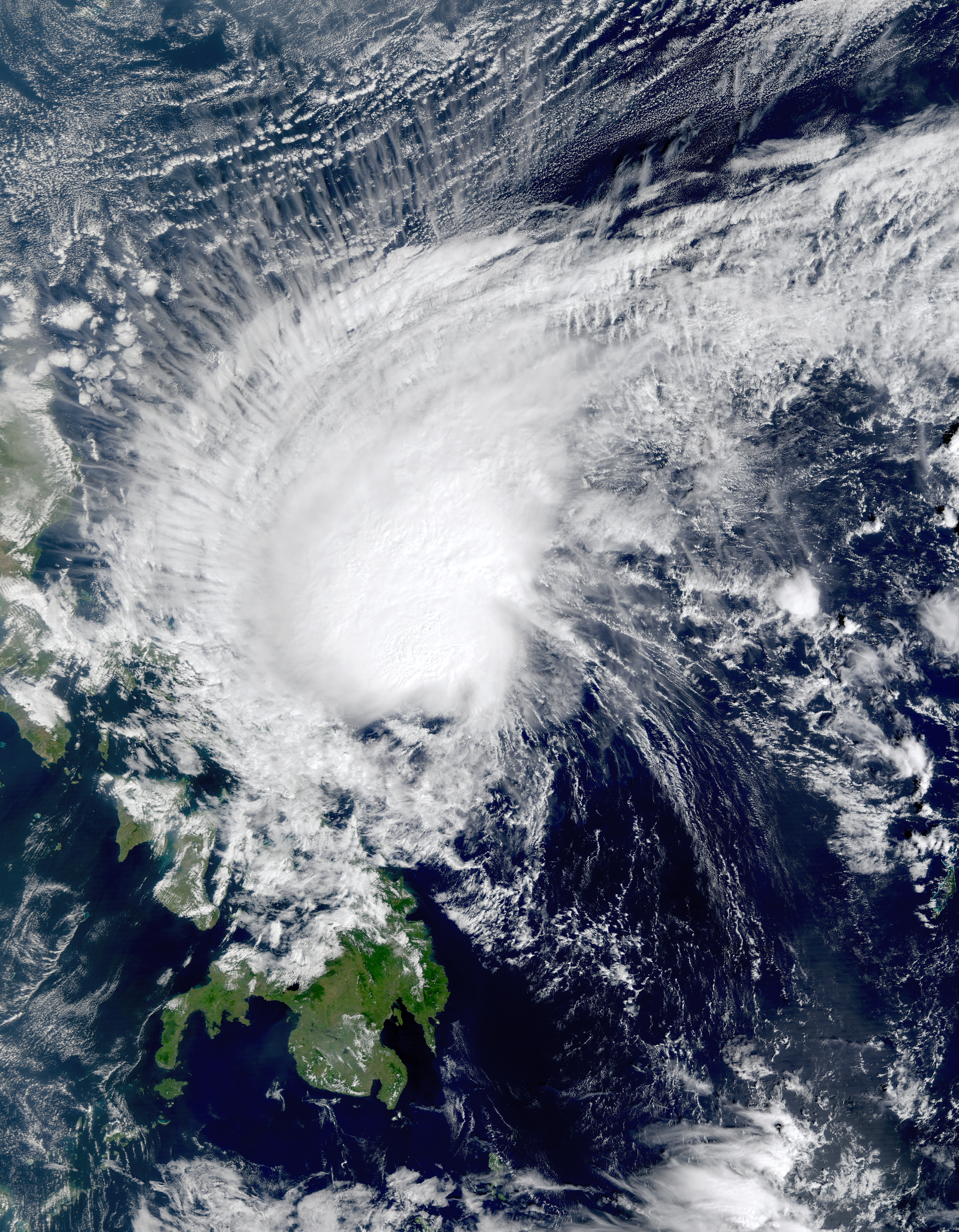
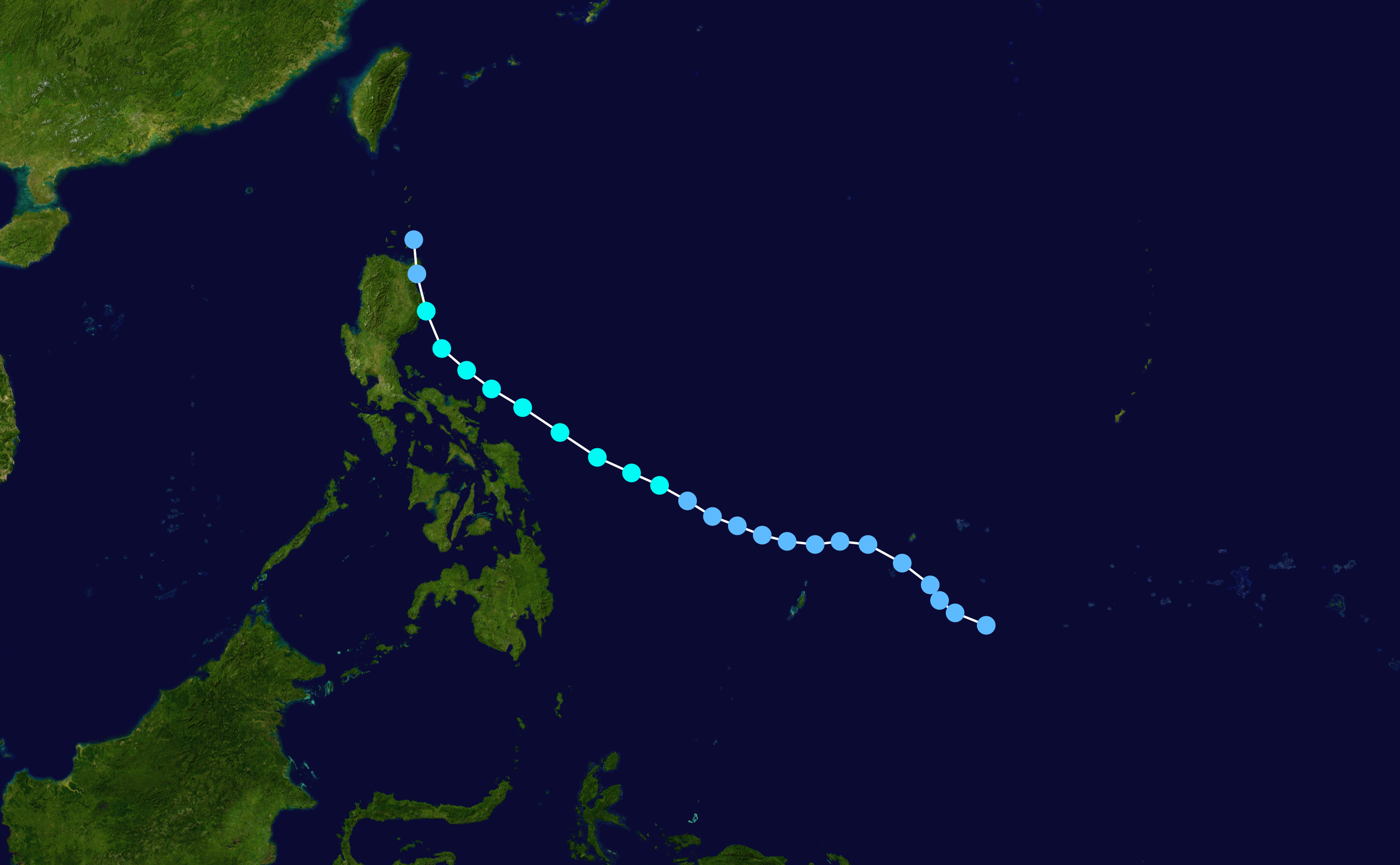
- Duration: January 9 – January 14
- Peak intensity: 75 km/h (45 mph) (10-min); 996 hPa (mbar)

The first storm of the season formed on January 9 near Palau. It developed from the monsoon trough and was first observed by the JTWC two days before its formation. The system initially consisted of an area of convection with a weak circulation, located in an area of weak wind shear. On January 10, the JMA classified the system as a tropical depression. On that same day, the JTWC initiated advisories on the depression and designated it 01W, while PAGASA assigned it the local name Agaton. The storm moved west-northwestward due to a ridge to the north, and the system gradually became better organized. On January 12, the JMA upgraded the depression into a tropical storm and named it Tapah. Later that day, the agency estimated Tapah's sustained winds of 75 km/h (45 mph). Around that time, Tapah developed an eye feature beneath its convection, prompting both the JTWC and PAGASA to upgrade its sustained winds intensity to a peak of 95 km/h (60 mph). An approaching trough weakened the ridge, which drifted the storm northwest. Due to increasing wind shear, convection gradually weakened, and the JMA downgraded Tapah to a tropical depression on January 13; however, other agencies maintained the system at tropical storm status. Tapah dissipated along the eastern coast of Luzon in the Philippines on the following day.

=== Typhoon Mitag (Basyang) ===
- Very strong typhoon (JMA)
- Category 5 super typhoon (SSHWS)
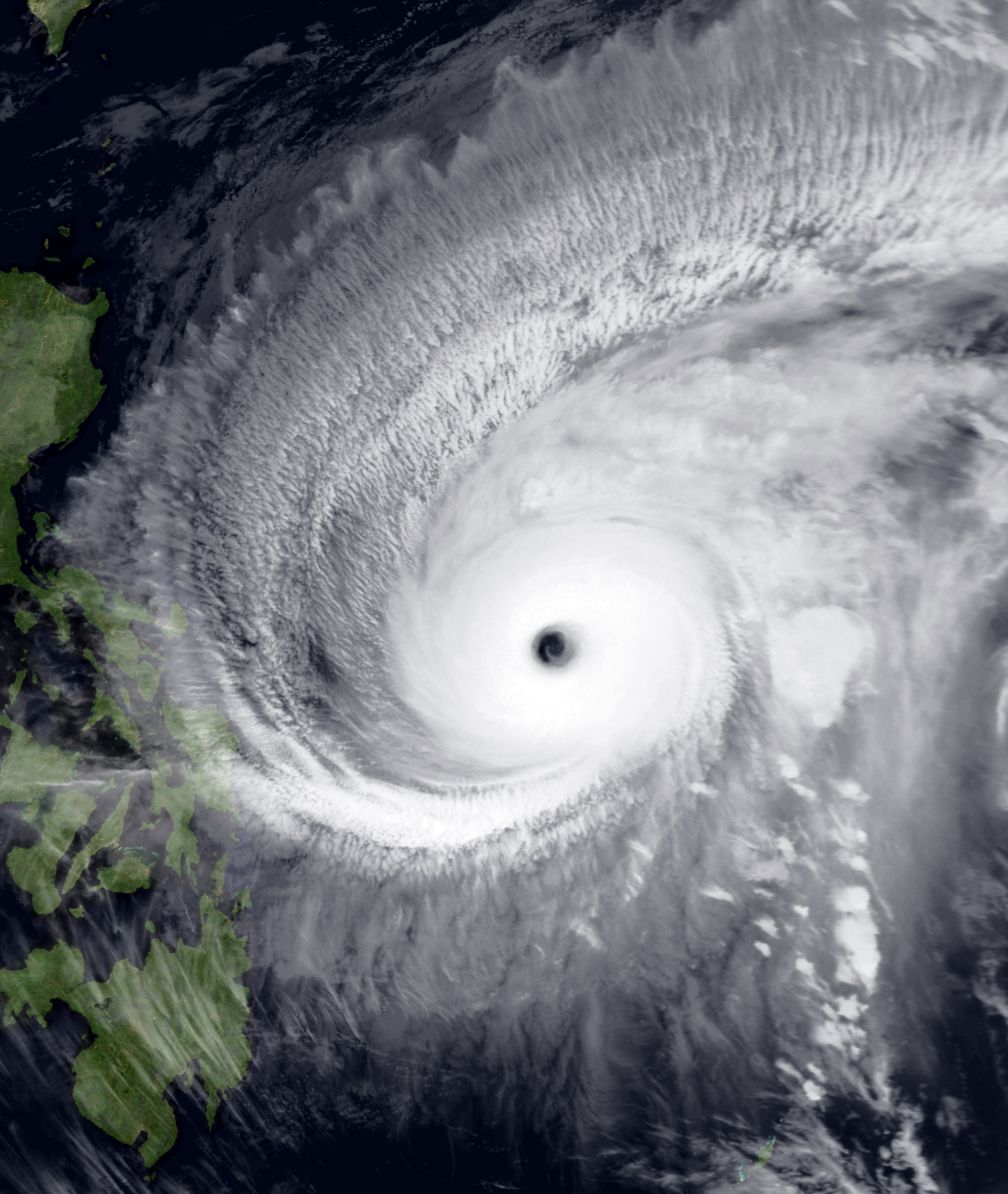
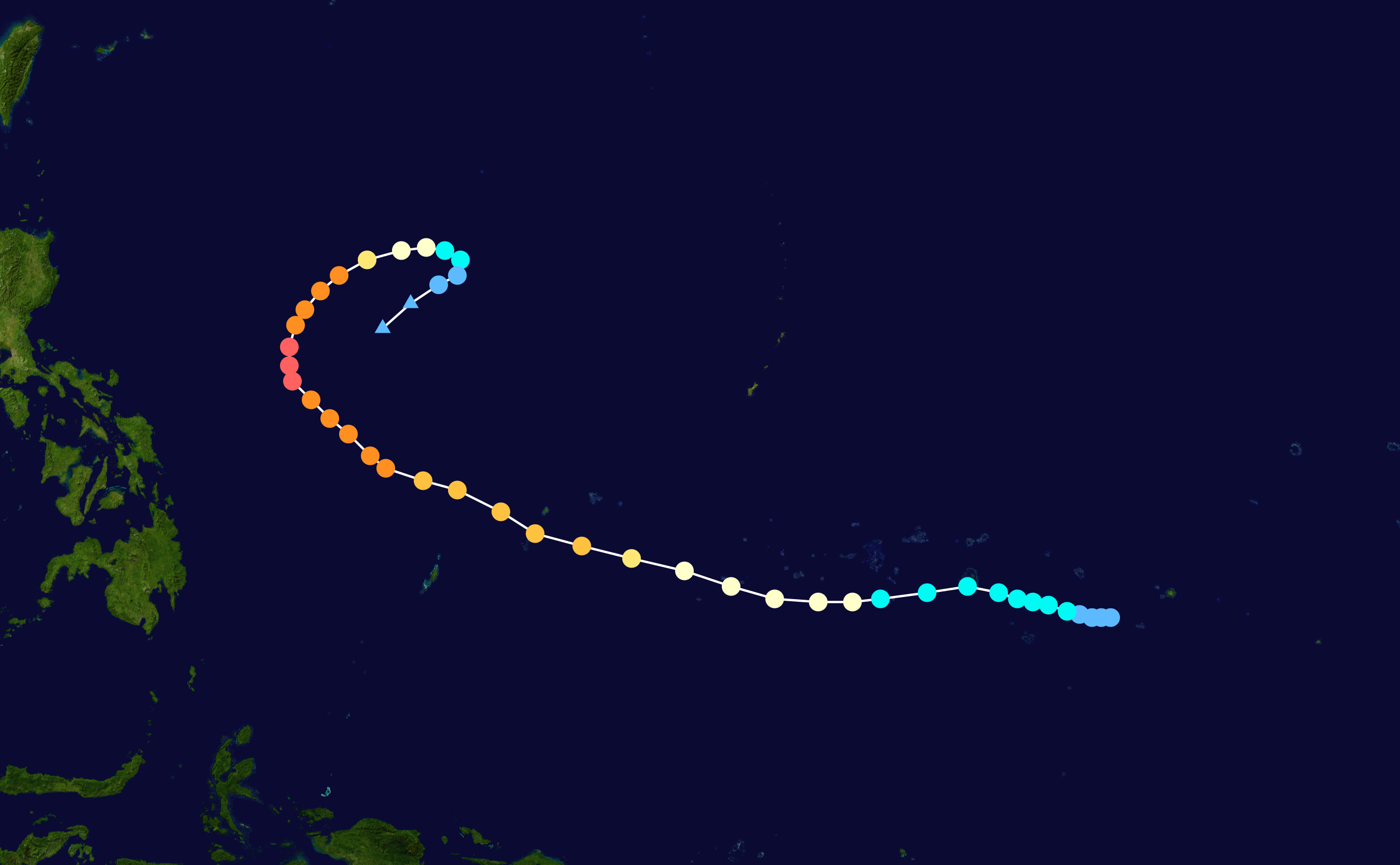
- Duration: February 26 – March 9
- Peak intensity: 175 km/h (110 mph) (10-min); 930 hPa (mbar)

The typhoon originated from a trough near the equator on February 25, near Micronesia. It moved westward through the archipelago and intensified into a typhoon, before passing near Yap on March 2. High winds and heavy rainfall affected the state, causing an islandwide power outage and destroying hundreds of houses. Mitag severely damaged crops, resulting in food shortages. The rainfall and storm surge flooded much of the coastline as well as Yap's capital, Colonia. Damage totaled $150 million, mostly to crops. There was one death related to the storm's aftermath.

After affecting Yap, Mitag turned northwestward and later northward due to an approaching trough. It passed north of Palau, killing one person there. Despite predictions of weakening, the typhoon continued to intensify, reaching its peak intensity with 10-minute sustained winds of 175 km/h (110 mph) on March 5. The JTWC estimated peak one-minute sustained winds of 260 km/h (160 mph) when the storm was approximately 610 km (380 mi) east of Catanduanes in the Philippines, making Mitag a super typhoon, the first one on record in the month of March. The combination of cooler air and interaction with the westerlies caused Mitag to weaken significantly, and four days later, the storm dissipated east of the Philippines.

=== Typhoon Hagibis ===
- Very strong typhoon (JMA)
- Category 5 super typhoon (SSHWS)
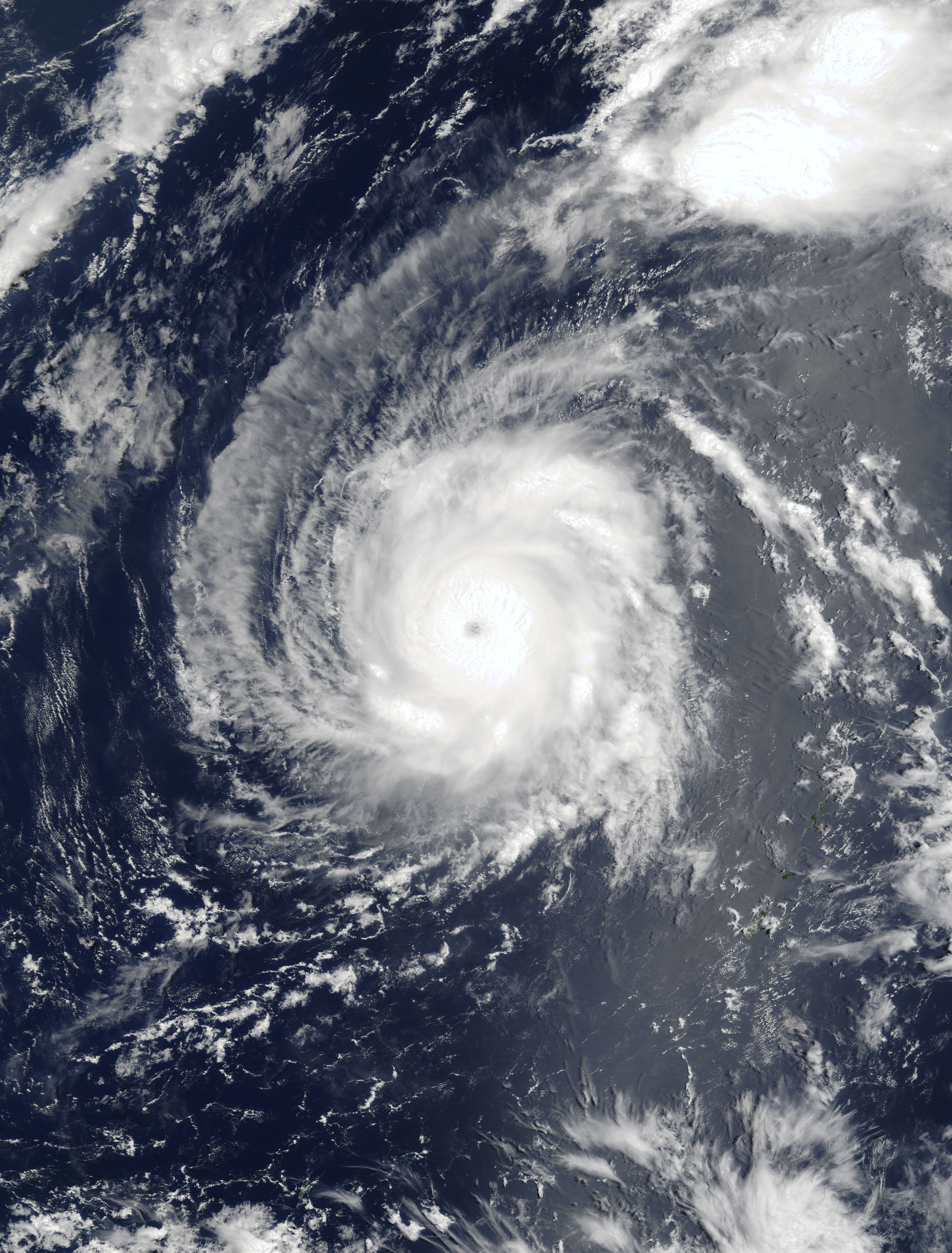
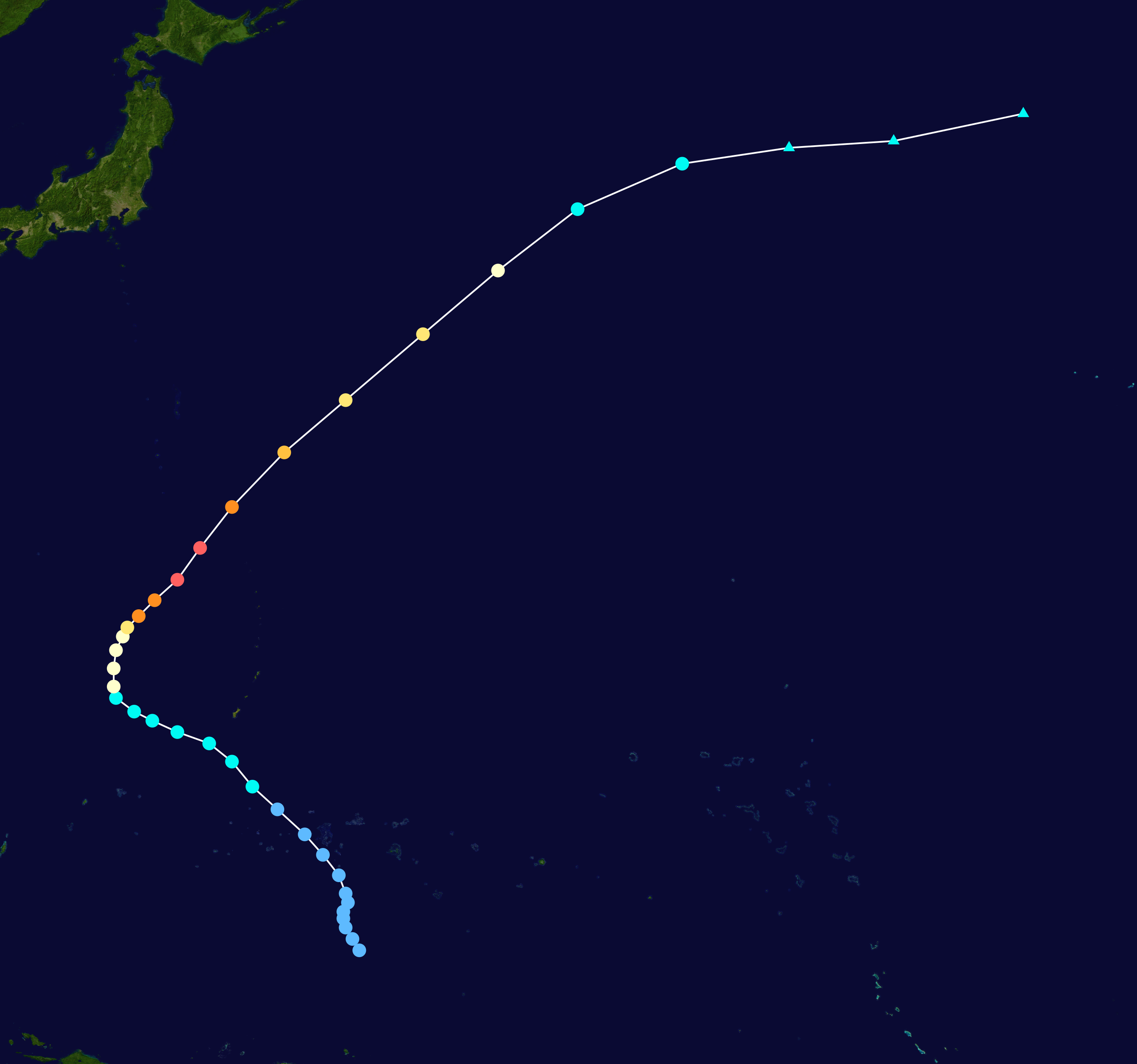
- Duration: May 14 – May 21
- Peak intensity: 175 km/h (110 mph) (10-min); 935 hPa (mbar)

The monsoon trough spawned a tropical disturbance near the Caroline Islands in mid-May. By that time, the system was an area of convection with a weak circulation, although the system organized as outflow improved. It tracked northwestward within the monsoon trough, steered by a mid-level ridge. The system developed into a tropical depression on May 14 about 500 km (310 mi) southwest of Chuuk Lagoon, and early the next day the JTWC initiated advisories. For several days the depression remained weak, until it intensified into a tropical storm named "Hagibis" on May 16, about 200 km (120 mi) southwest of Guam. The developing storm dropped rainfall on Guam that ended the island's wildfire season. The storm quickly intensified, developing an eye feature later that day. Early on May 18, the JMA upgraded Hagibis into a typhoon, and around that time, an approaching trough turned the storm to the northeast.

While accelerating northeastward, Hagibis developed a well-defined eye and underwent a period of rapid deepening. On May 19, the JMA estimated peak 10-minute winds of 175 km/h (109 mph), and the JTWC estimated 1-minute winds of 260 km/h (160 mph); this made Hagibis become a second super typhoon after Mitag. At the time of its peak, the typhoon was located about 305 km (190 mi) west-southwest of the Northern Mariana Islands. Hagibis only maintained its peak for about 12 hours, after which the eye began weakening. The trough that caused the typhoon's acceleration also caused the storm to lose tropical characteristics, and dry air gradually became entrained in the circulation. On May 21, Hagibis became extratropical to the east of Japan after having weakened below typhoon intensity. The remnants continued to the northeast and dissipated south of the Aleutian Islands on May 22.

=== Severe Tropical Storm Noguri (Espada) ===
- Severe tropical storm (JMA)
- Category 2 typhoon (SSHWS)
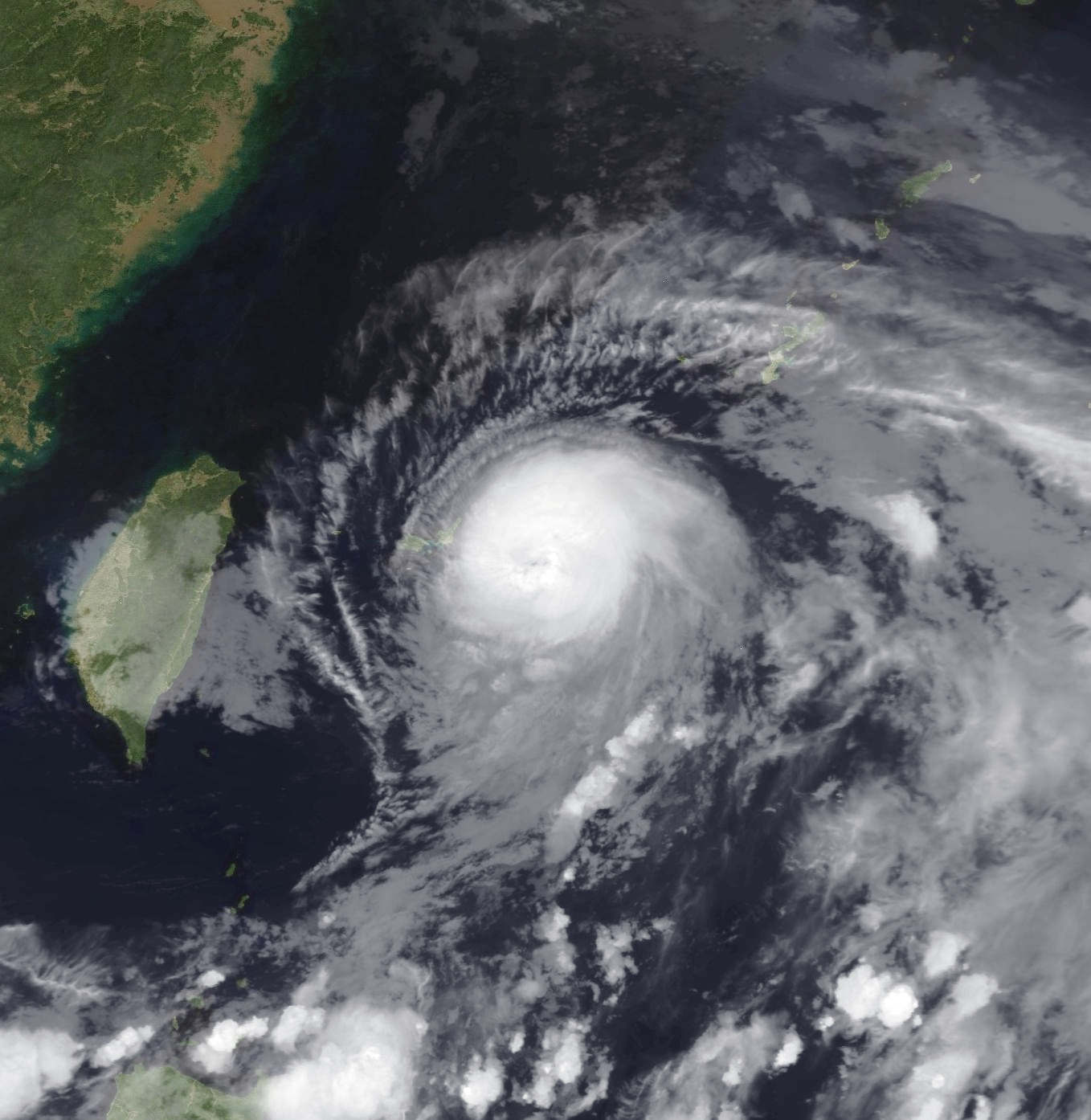
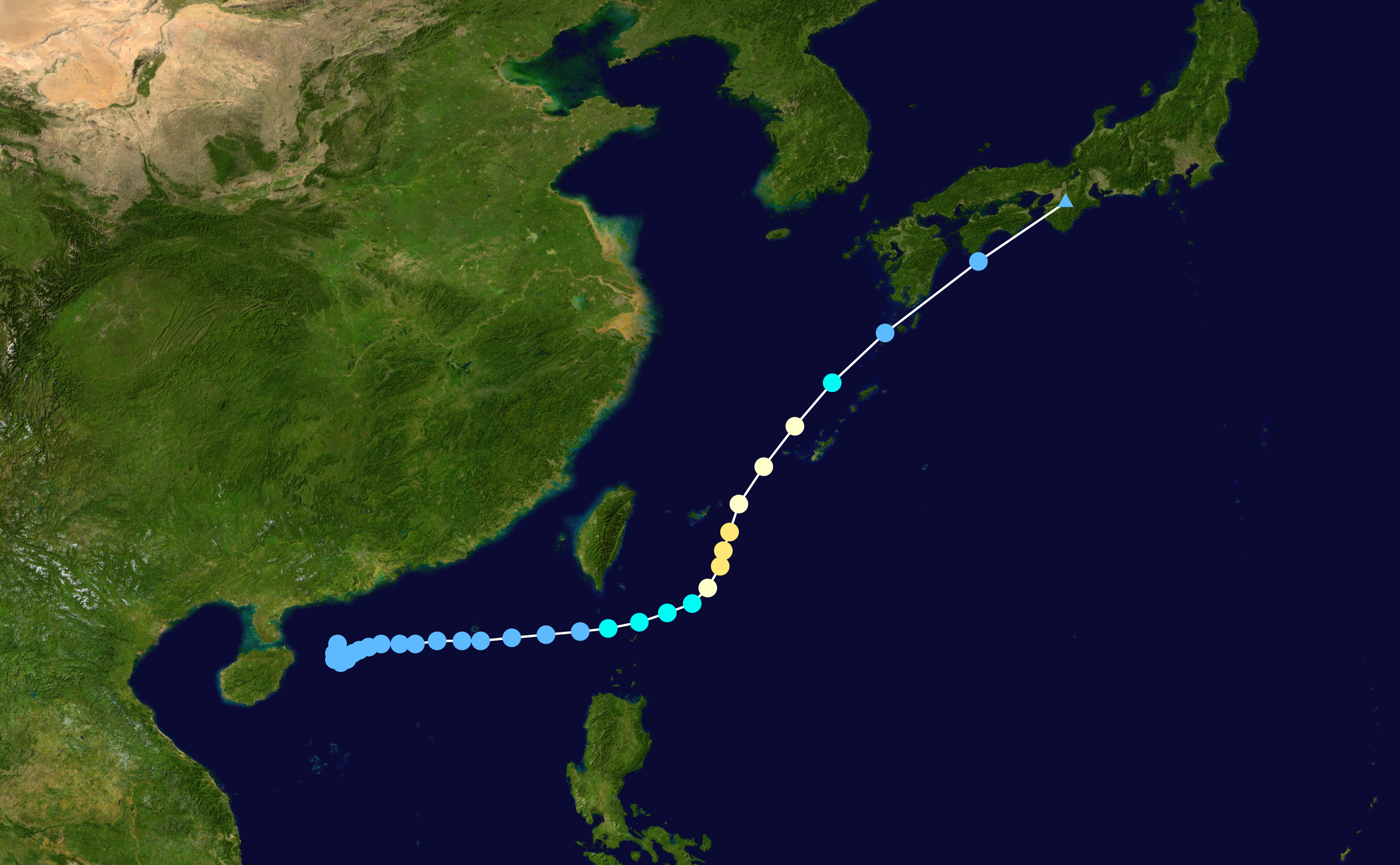
- Duration: June 4 – June 11
- Peak intensity: 110 km/h (70 mph) (10-min); 975 hPa (mbar)

In early June, a disturbance within the monsoon trough persisted in the South China Sea to the east of Vietnam. On June 4, a tropical depression developed just off the east coast of Hainan, with a broad circulation and scattered convection. The system tracked slowly eastward due to a ridge to the north, and conditions favored intensification, including favorable outflow and minimal wind shear. The JTWC initiated advisories on June 6, and despite the favorable conditions, the depression remained weak. On June 7, the system briefly entered the Philippine Area of Responsibility, and PAGASA named it as "Espada". Later that day, the JTWC upgraded the depression to a tropical storm, and on June 8 the JMA upgraded the depression into "Noguri", halfway between Taiwan and Luzon. Increased outflow from an approaching trough allowed the storm to quickly intensify. The JTWC upgraded Noguri into a minimal typhoon late on June 8, after an eye developed. By that time, the storm was moving to the northeast due to a building ridge to the southeast. The JMA only estimated peak 10-minute winds of 110 km/h (68 mph), making Noguri become a severe tropical storm. However, the JTWC estimated peak winds of 160 km/h (99 mph), after the eye became well-organized. Increasing wind shear weakened Noguri, and the storm passed just west of the Miyako-jima on June 9. The convection diminished, and the JTWC declared Noguri as extratropical while the storm was approaching on Japan. The JMA continued tracking the storm until it dissipated over the Kii Peninsula on June 11.

While passing the south of Taiwan, it dropped heavy rainfall peaking at 320 mm (13 in) in Pingtung County. Rainfall in Japan peaked at 123 mm (4.8 in) at a station in Kagoshima Prefecture. The threat of the storm prompted school closures and 20 airline flight cancellations. Noguri injured one person, damaged one house, and caused about $4 million (¥504 million JPY) in agricultural damage. (Note: The total was originally reported in Japanese yen. Total converted via the Oanda Corporation website.)

=== Typhoon Rammasun (Florita) ===
- Very strong typhoon (JMA)
- Category 3 typhoon (SSHWS)
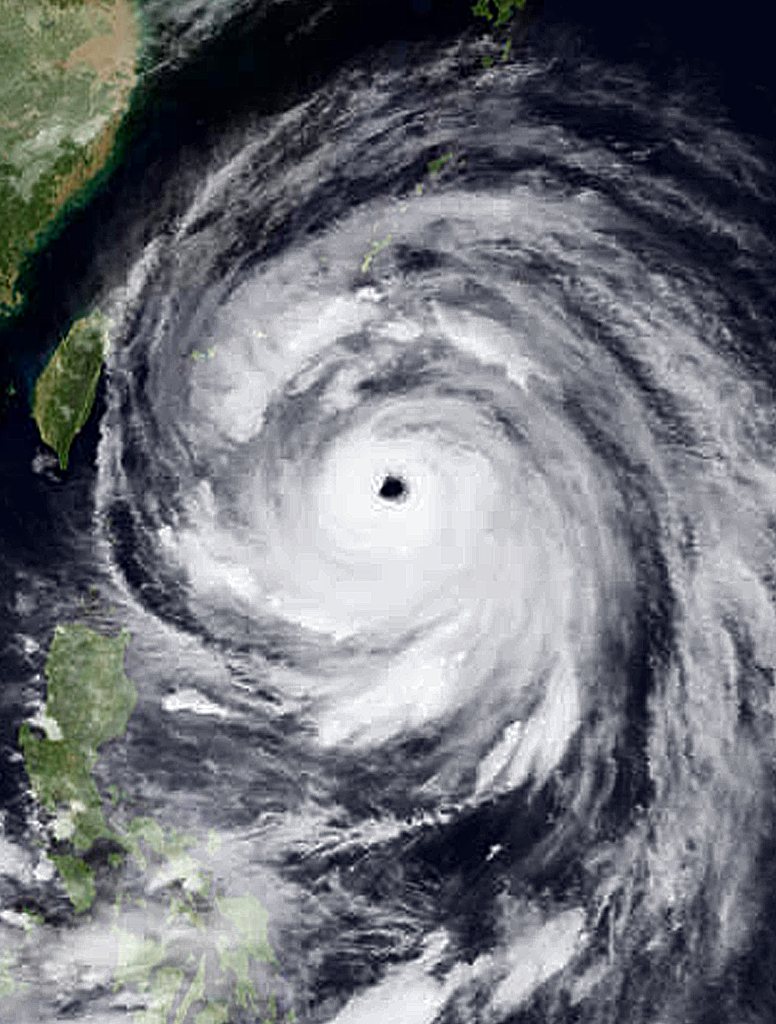
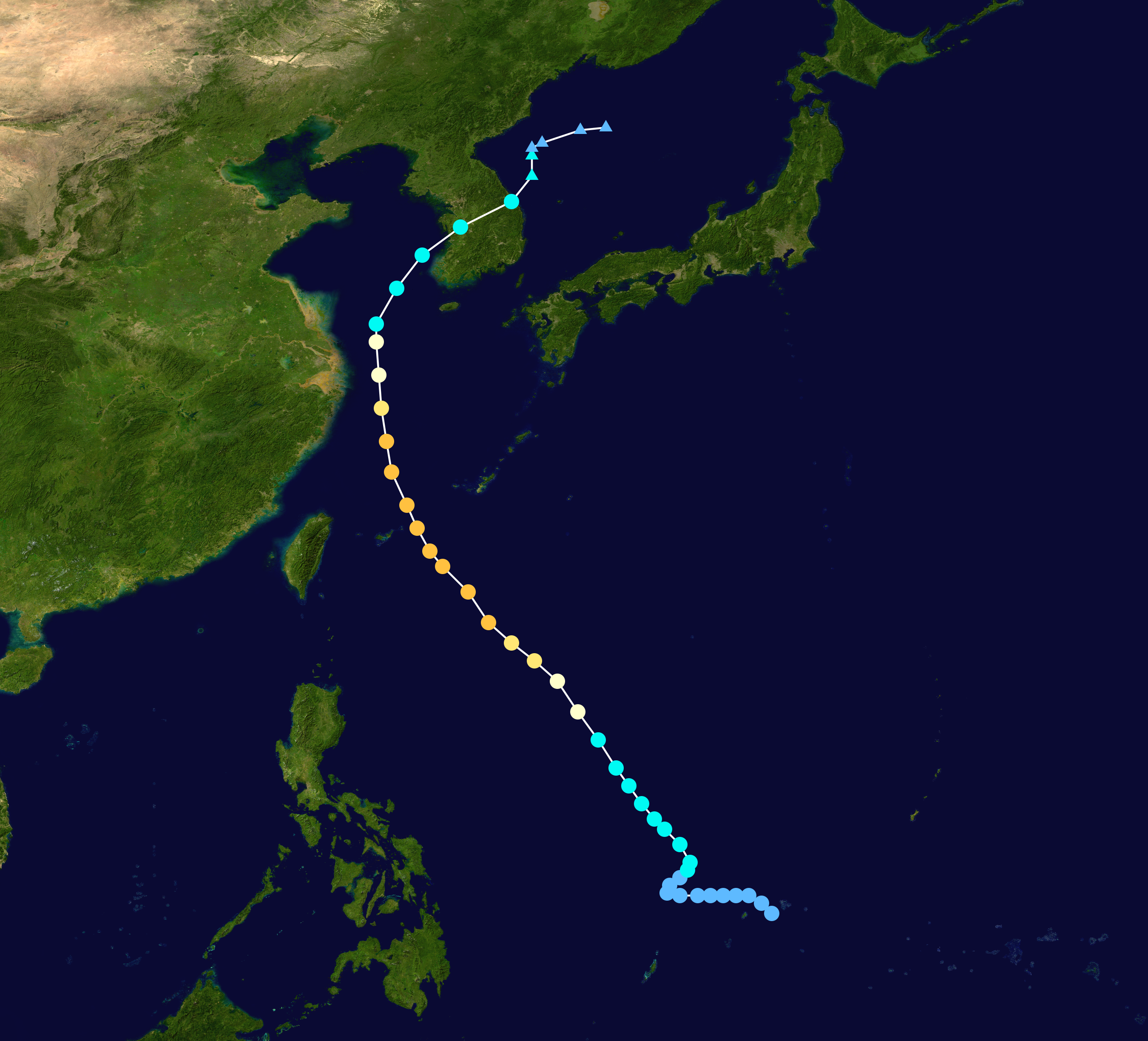
- Duration: June 28 – July 6
- Peak intensity: 155 km/h (100 mph) (10-min); 945 hPa (mbar)

Rammasun was the first of four typhoons to contribute to heavy rainfall and deadly flooding in the Philippines in July; there were 85 deaths related to the four storms, with 2,463 homes damaged or destroyed. Rammasun developed around the same time as Typhoon Chataan, but farther to the west. The storm tracked northwestward toward Taiwan, and on July 2 it attained its peak intensity with winds of 155 km/h (96 mph). Rammasun turned northward, passing east of Taiwan and China. In Taiwan, the outer rainbands dropped rainfall that alleviated drought conditions. In contrast, rainfall in China followed previously wet conditions, resulting in additional flooding, although less damage than expected; there was about $85 million in crop and fishery damage in Zhejiang.

After affecting two countries, Rammasun began weakening due to an approaching trough, which turned the typhoon northeastward. It passed over the Japanese island of Miyako-jima and also produced strong winds in Okinawa. About 10,000 houses lost power on the island, and high surf killed two sailors. On the Japanese mainland, there was light crop damage and one serious injury. After weakening into a tropical storm, Rammasun passed just west of the South Korean island of Jejudo, where high waves killed one person. The storm crossed the country, killing three others and leaving $9.5 million in damage. High rains from Rammasun also affected North Korea, and Primorsky Krai in the Russian Far East.

=== Typhoon Chataan (Gloria) ===
- Very strong typhoon (JMA)
- Category 4 super typhoon (SSHWS)
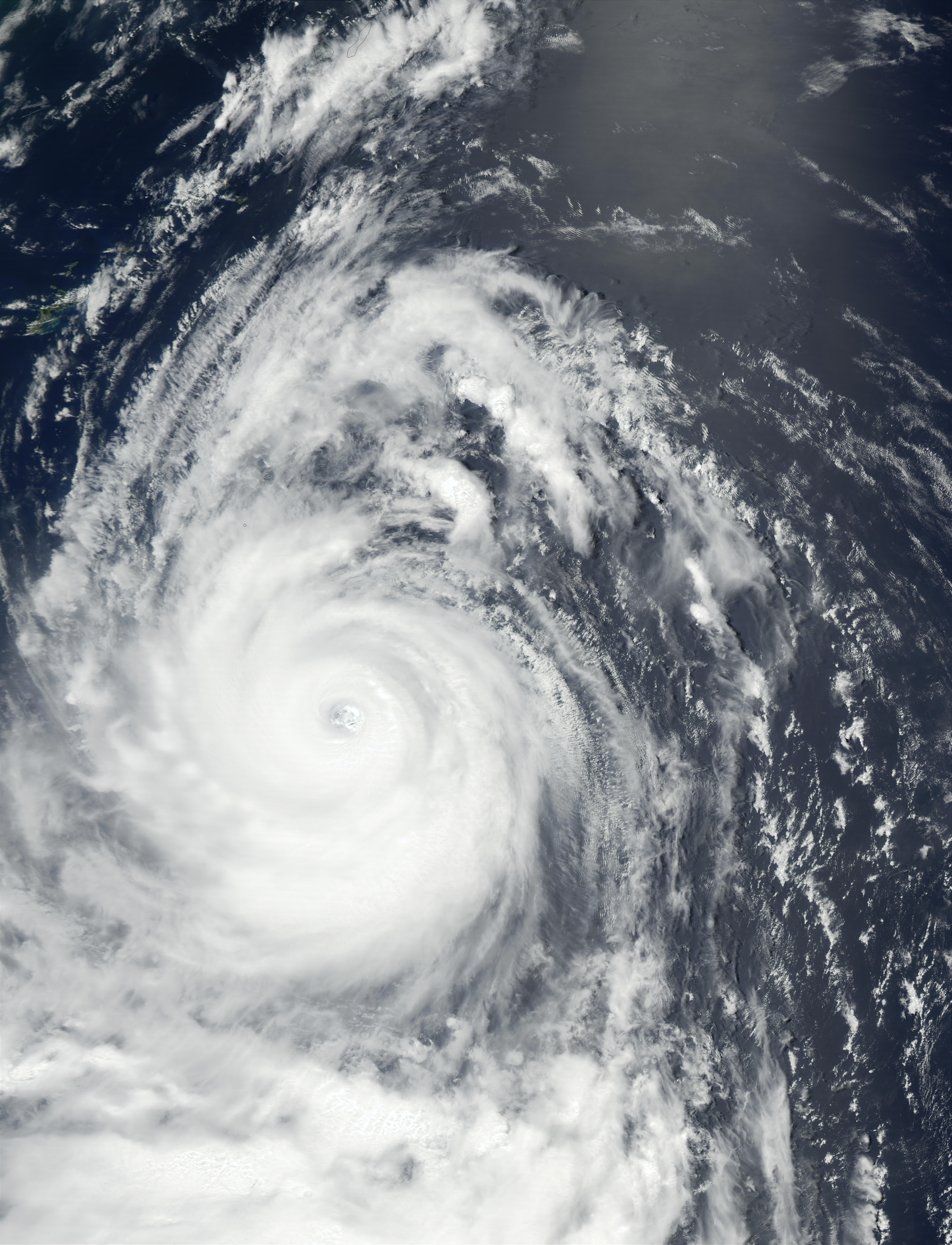
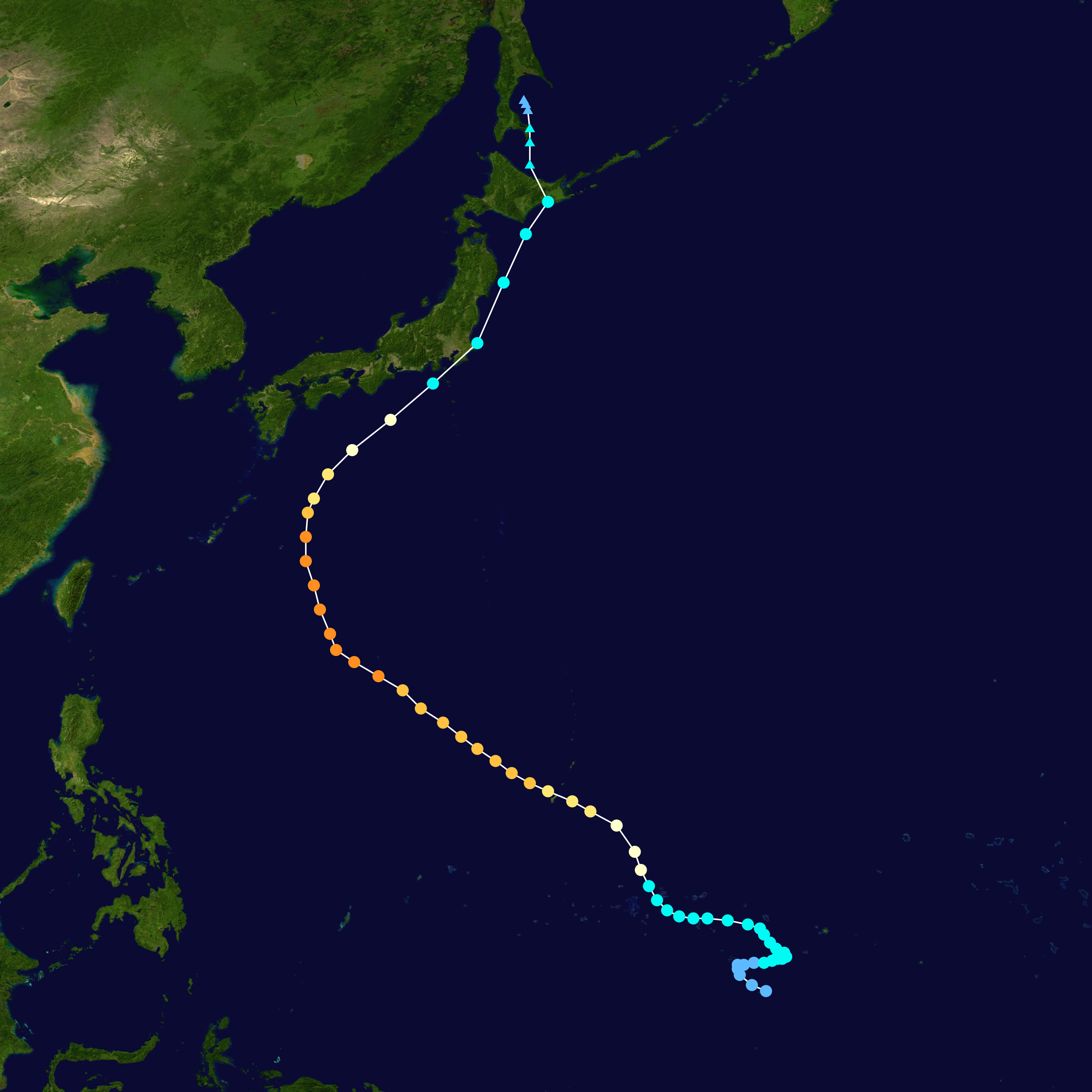
- Duration: June 28 – July 11
- Peak intensity: 175 km/h (110 mph) (10-min); 930 hPa (mbar)

Chataan formed on June 28, near Micronesia, and for several days it meandered while producing heavy rainfall across the region. In the Micronesian state of Chuuk, the highest 24-hour precipitation total was 506 mm (19.9 in), which was greater than the average monthly total. The rain produced floods up to 1.5 m (4.9 ft) deep, causing deadly landslides across the island that killed 47 people; this made Chataan become the deadliest natural disaster in Micronesia's history. There was also one death on nearby Pohnpei. Damage in Micronesia totaled over $100 million.

After affecting Chuuk, Chataan began a northwest track as an intensifying typhoon. Its eye passed just north of Guam on July 4, though the eyewall moved across the island and dropped heavy rainfall. Totals were highest in southern Guam, peaking at 536 mm (21.1 in). Flooding and landslides from the storm severely damaged or destroyed 1,994 houses. Damage on the island totaled $60.5 million, and there were 23 injuries. The typhoon also affected Rota in the Northern Mariana Islands with gusty winds and light rainfall. Chataan attained its peak intensity of 175 km/h (109 mph) on July 8. It weakened while turning to the north, and after diminishing to a tropical storm, Chataan struck eastern Japan on July 10. High rainfall, peaking at 509 mm (20.0 in), flooded 10,270 houses.

Damage in Japan totaled about $500 million (¥59 billion JPY).

=== Typhoon Halong (Inday) ===
- Very strong typhoon (JMA)
- Category 4 super typhoon (SSHWS)
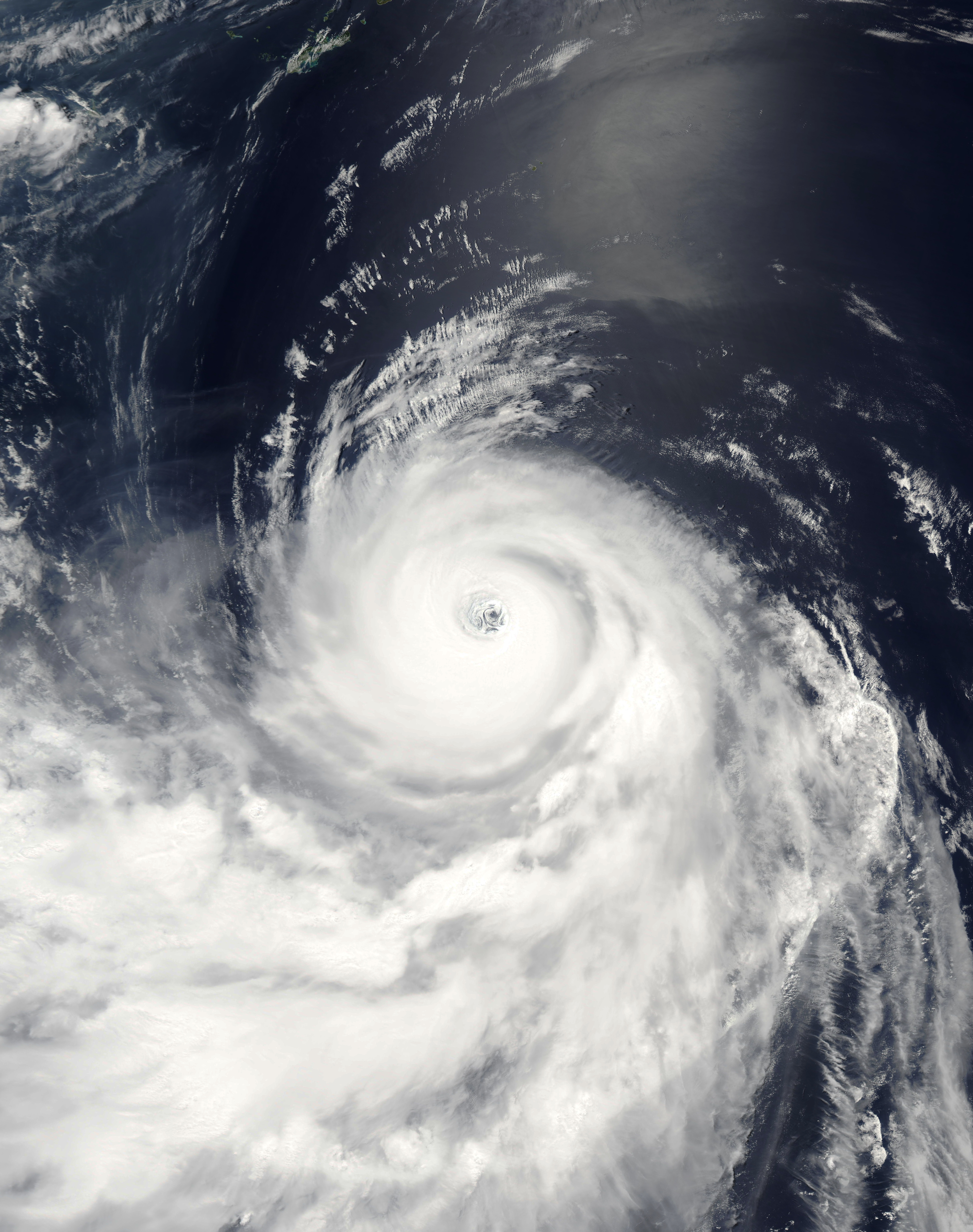
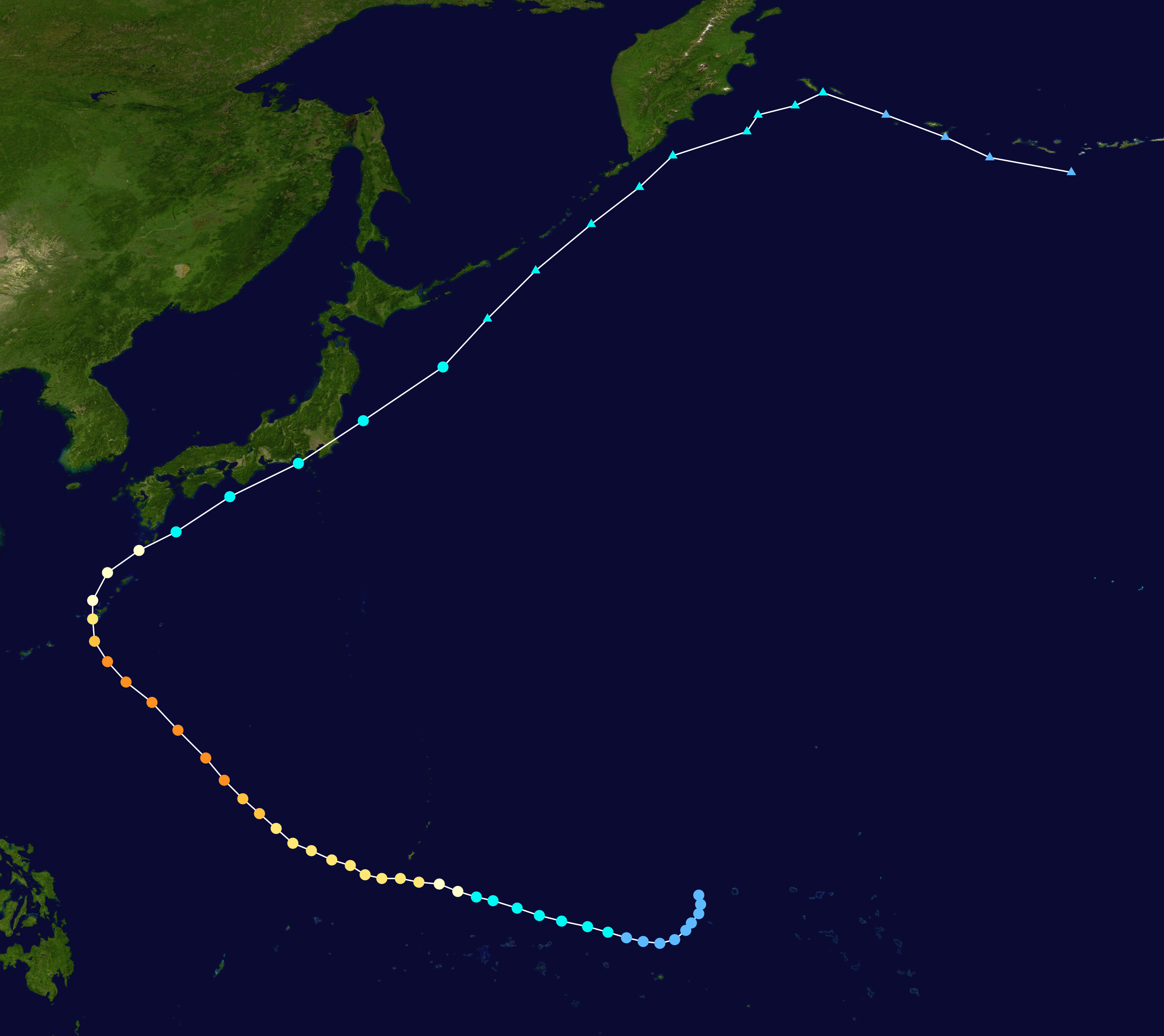
- Duration: July 6 – July 16
- Peak intensity: 155 km/h (100 mph) (10-min); 945 hPa (mbar)

The monsoon trough spawned a tropical depression on July 5, near the Marshall Islands, where Chataan originated. For much of its duration moved toward the northwest, gradually intensifying into a tropical storm named "Halong". Early on July 10, Halong passed just south of Guam, according to the JMA, although the JTWC assessed it as a typhoon near the island. It had threatened to strike the island less than a week after Chataan's damaging landfall, and although Halong remained south of Guam, it produced high waves and gusty winds on the island. The storm disrupted relief efforts following Chataan, causing additional power outages but little damage.

After affecting Guam, Halong quickly strengthened into a typhoon and reached its peak winds on July 12. The JTWC estimated peak 1-minute winds of 250 km/h (160 mph), while the JMA estimated 10-minute winds of 155 km/h (96 mph). The typhoon weakened greatly while curving to the northeast, although its winds caused widespread power outages on Okinawa. Halong struck southeastern Japan, dropping heavy rainfall and producing strong winds that left $89.8 million (¥10.3 billion JPY) in damage. There was one death in the country and nine injuries. Halong became extratropical on July 16 and dissipated the next day.

=== Severe Tropical Storm Nakri (Hambalos) ===
- Severe tropical storm (JMA)
- Tropical storm (SSHWS)
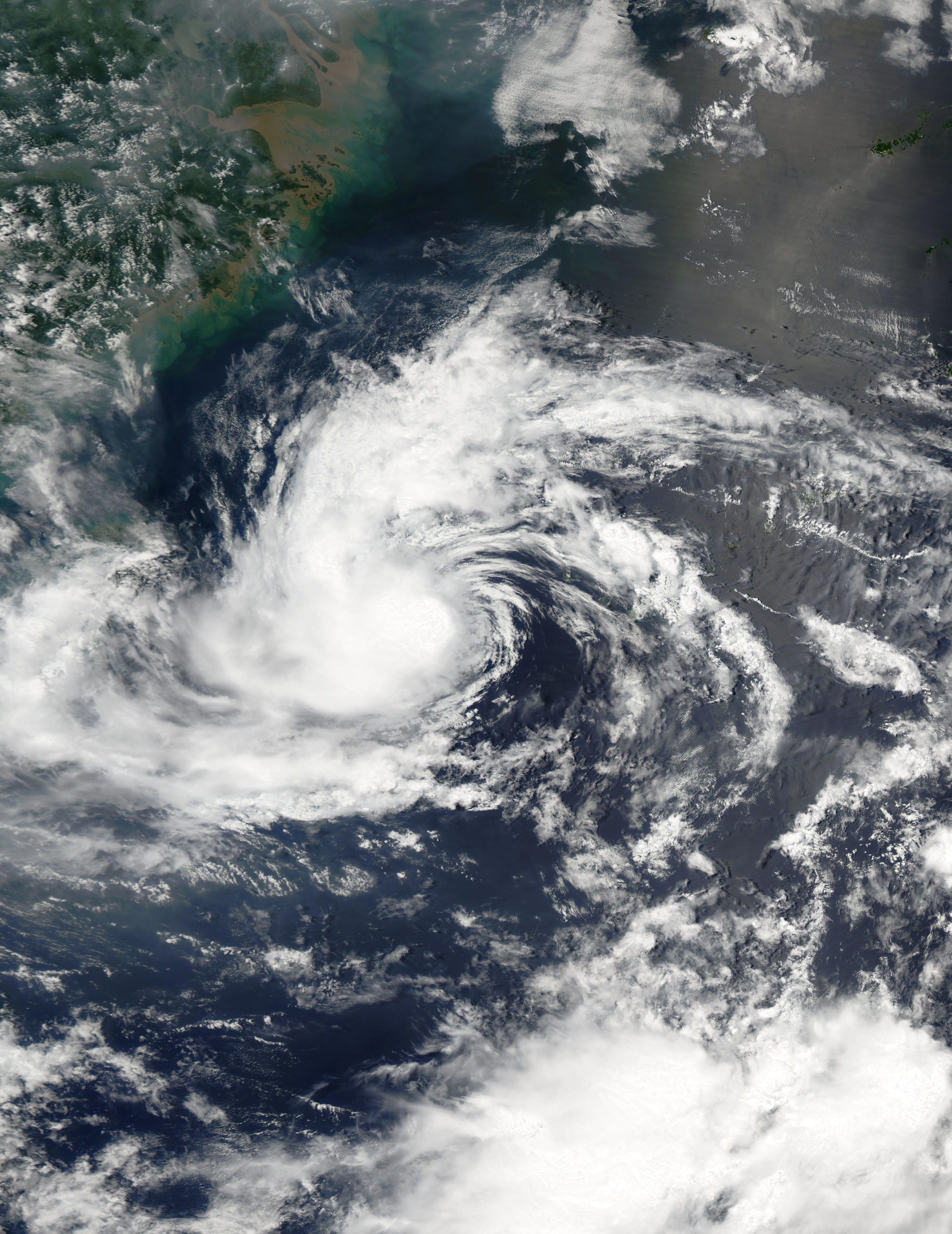
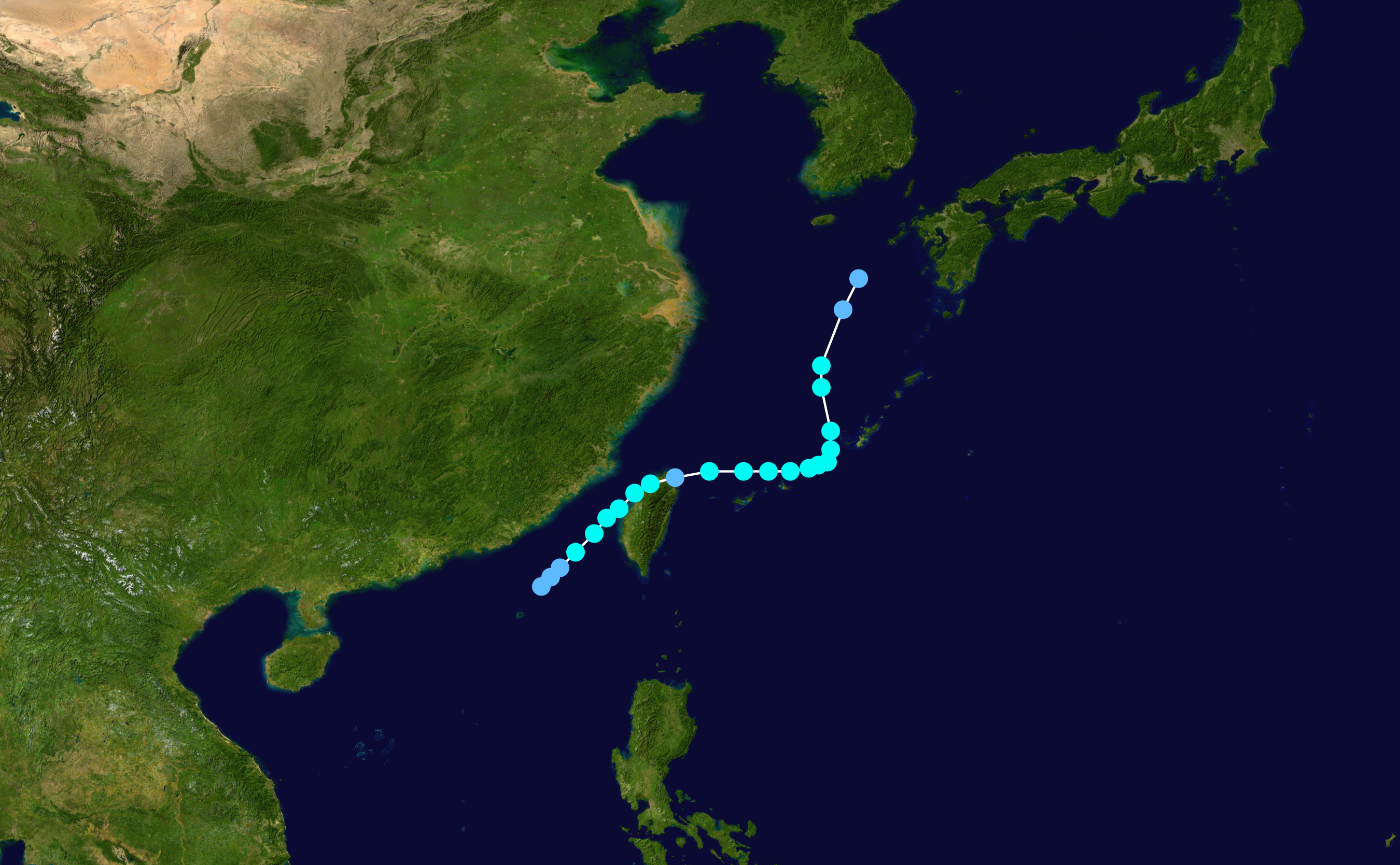
- Duration: July 7 – July 13
- Peak intensity: 95 km/h (60 mph) (10-min); 983 hPa (mbar)

A circulation formed on July 7 in the South China Sea, with associated convection located to the south. Outflow increased as the system became better organized, and late on July 7 a tropical depression formed to the southwest of Taiwan. A ridge located over the Philippines caused the system to track northeastward. Early on July 9, the JMA upgraded the depression into a tropical storm named "Nakri", near western Taiwan. It was a small storm, and while moving along the northern portion of the island, Nakri weakened as its convection diminished. However, it intensified while moving away from Taiwan, reaching peak winds of 95 km/h (59 mph) on July 10. The monsoon trough turned Nakri to the east for two days, until a weakening ridge turned it to the north on July 12. That day, Nakri passed just west of Okinawa, and shortly thereafter Nakri weakened into a tropical depression, after experiencing cooler waters and increasing shear. On July 13, Nakri fully dissipated west of Kyushu.

While passing over Taiwan, Nakri dropped heavy rainfall that reached 647 mm (25.5 in) at Pengjia Islet. A total of 170 mm (6.7 in) fell in one day at the Feitsui Dam, representing the highest daily total at that point in the year. Taiwan had experienced drought conditions prior to Rammasun earlier, and additional rainfall from Nakri eliminated all remaining water restrictions. Airline flights were canceled throughout the region due to the storm, and some schools and offices were closed. Nakri killed one fisherman and a shipworker during its passage. High rains also affected southeastern China, and later Okinawa. The storm induced heavy rainfall in the Philippines, as well as in Japan, where landslides and flooding were reported along a cold front.

=== Typhoon Fengshen ===
- Very strong typhoon (JMA)
- Category 5 super typhoon (SSHWS)
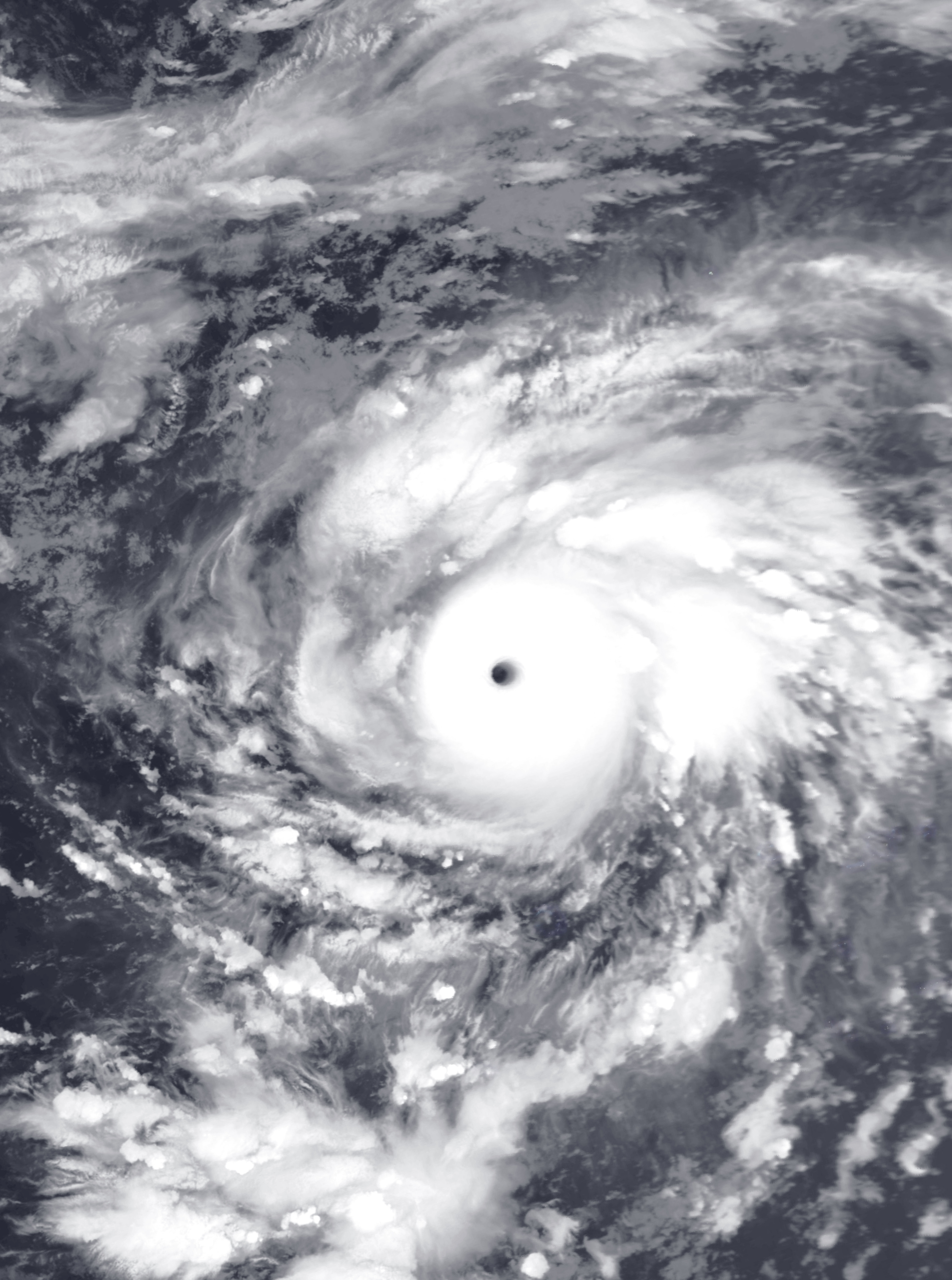
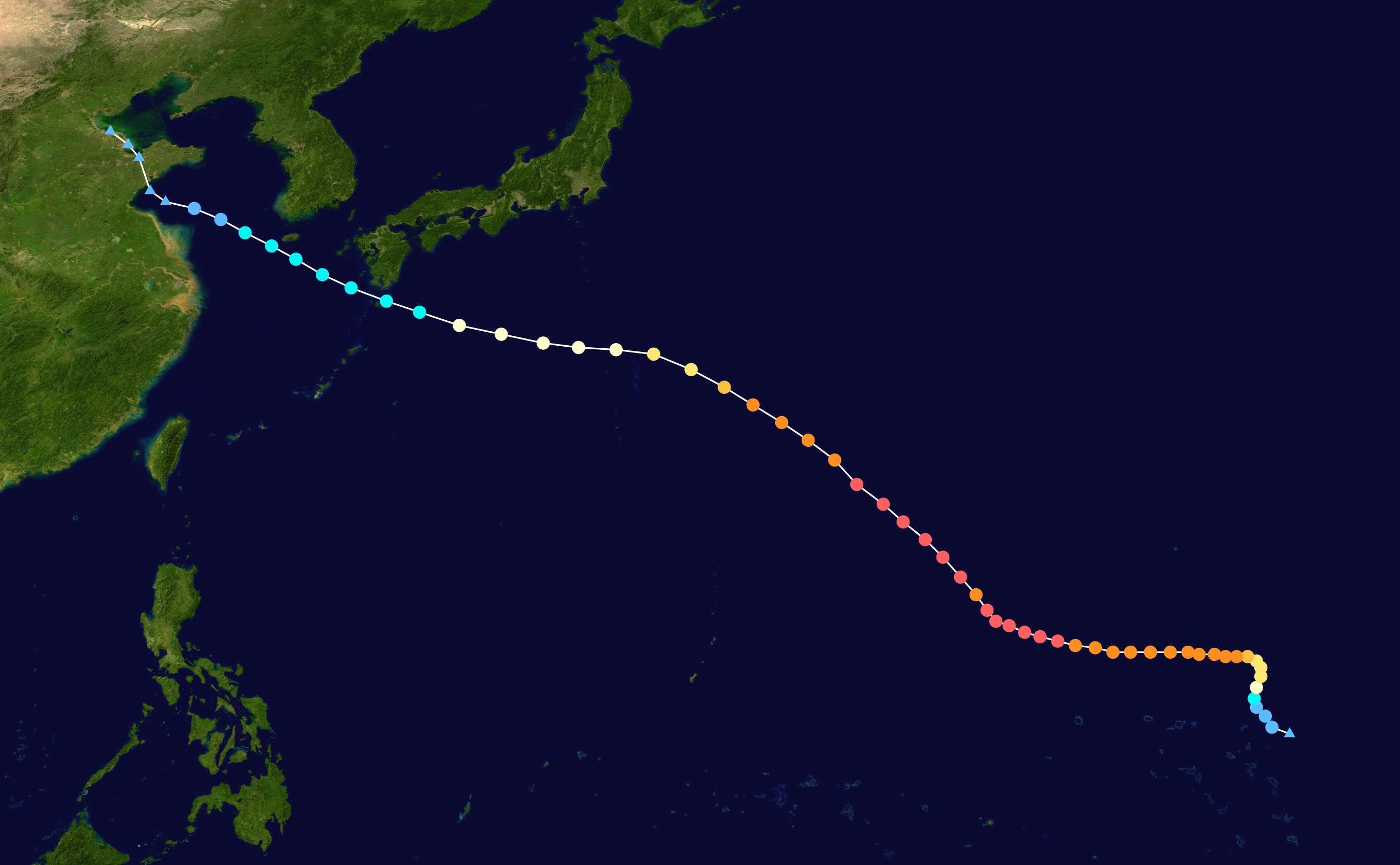
- Duration: July 13 – July 28
- Peak intensity: 185 km/h (115 mph) (10-min); 920 hPa (mbar)

The monsoon trough spawned a tropical depression on July 13. Due to its small size, it quickly intensified into a tropical storm named "Fengshen". By July 15, Fengshen attained typhoon status, and after initially moving to the north, it began a movement toward the northwest. On July 18, the typhoon reached peak 10-minute winds of 185 km/h (115 mph), according to the JMA, making it the strongest storm of the season. The JTWC estimated peak 1-minute winds of 270 km/h (170 mph), and the agency estimated that Fengshen was a super typhoon for five days. This broke the record for longest duration at that intensity, previously set by Typhoon Joan in 1997, and later tied by Typhoon Ioke in 2006.

While near peak intensity, Typhoon Fengshen underwent the Fujiwhara effect with Fung-wong, causing the latter storm to loop to its south. Fengshen gradually weakened while approaching Japan, and it crossed over the country's Ōsumi Islands on July 25 as a severe tropical storm. When the typhoon washed a freighter ashore, four people drowned and the remaining fifteen were rescued. In the country, Fengshen dropped heavy rainfall and produced heavy rains, causing mudslides, $4 million (¥475 million JPY) in crop damage, and one death.

After affecting Japan, Fengshen weakened in the Yellow Sea into a tropical depression, before moving across China's Shandong Peninsula and dissipating on July 28.

=== Typhoon Fung-wong (Kaka) ===
- Typhoon (JMA)
- Category 1 typhoon (SSHWS)
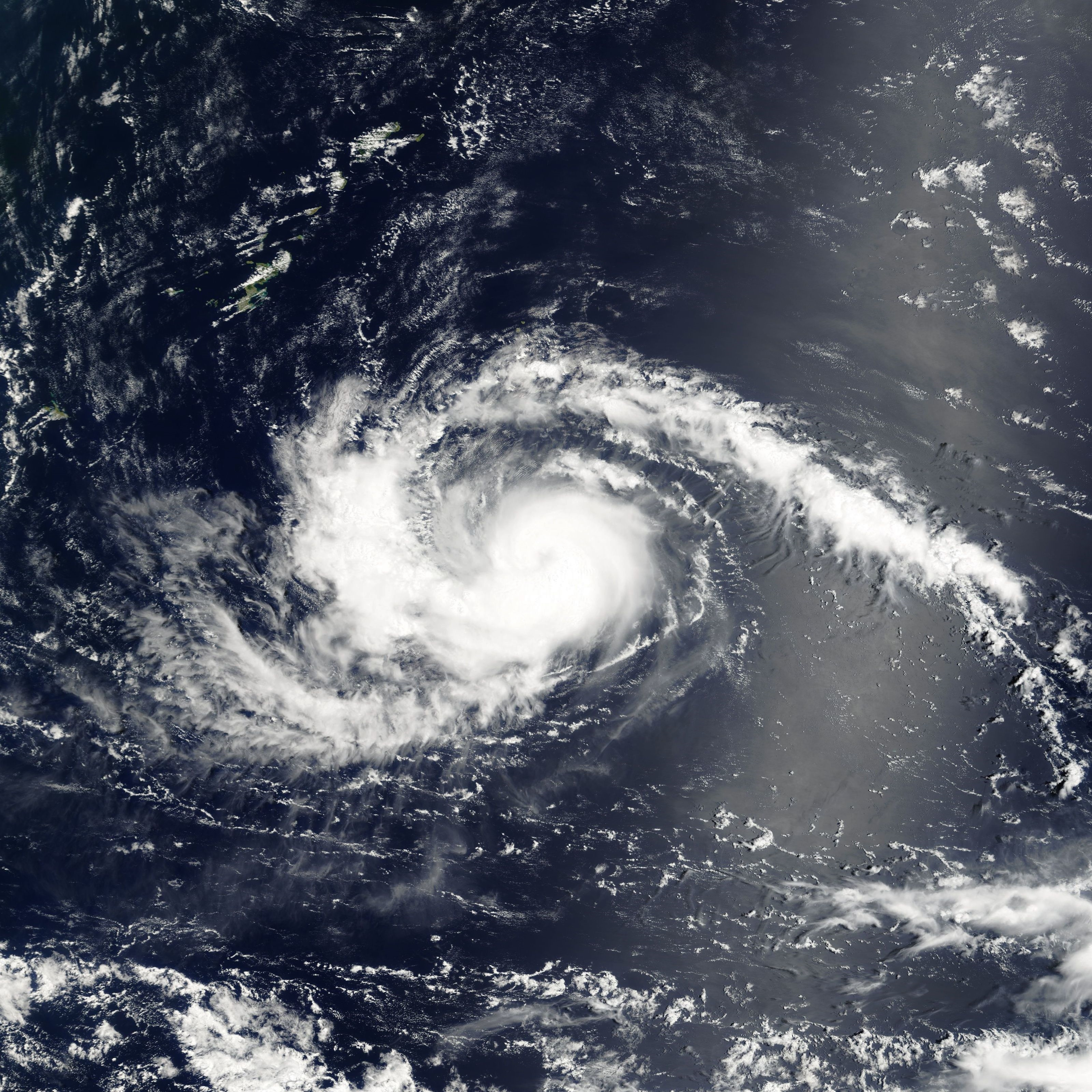
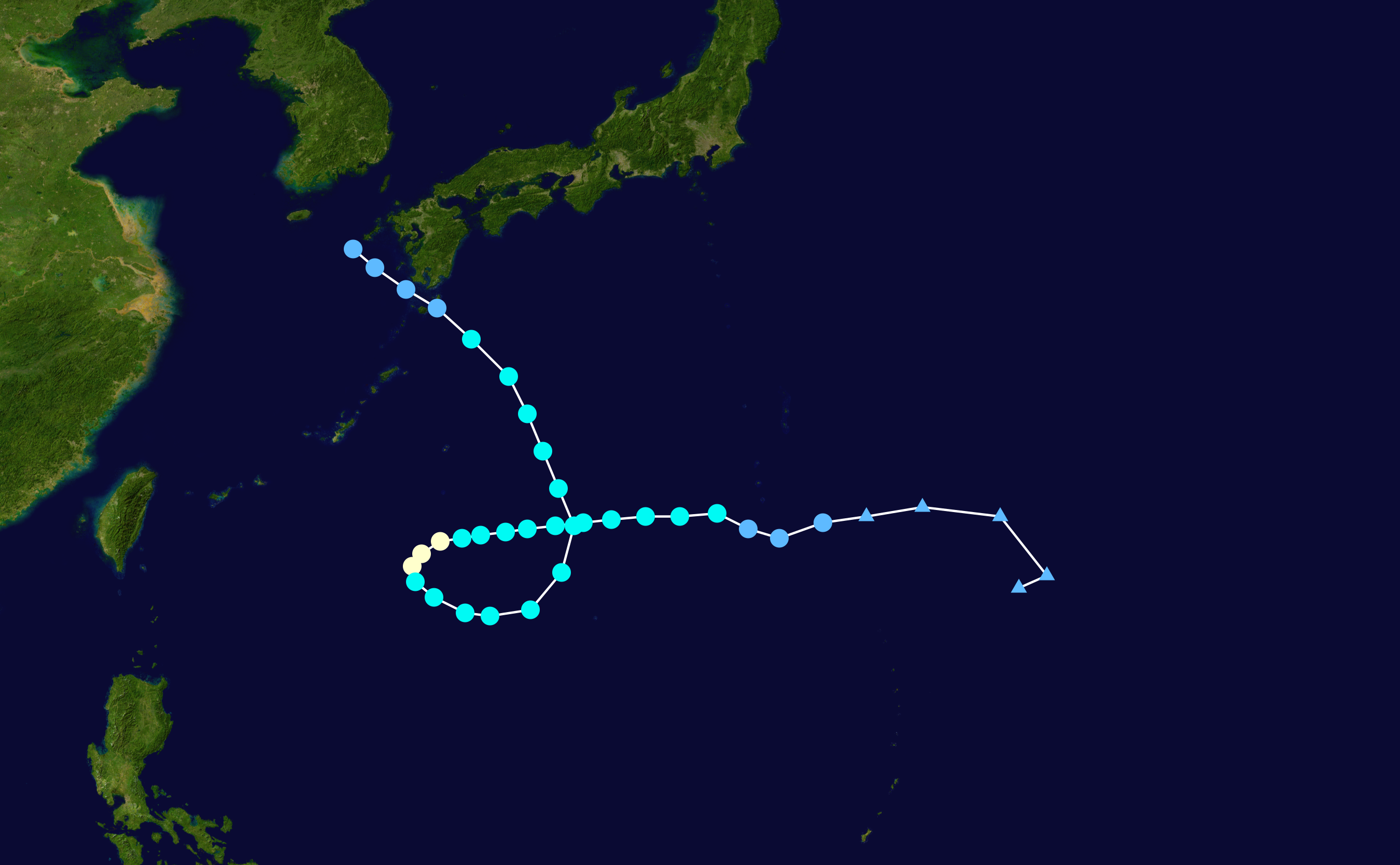
- Duration: July 18 – July 27
- Peak intensity: 130 km/h (80 mph) (10-min); 960 hPa (mbar)

A small circulation formed northeast of the Northern Marianas Islands on July 18. Later that day, the JMA classified the system as a tropical depression. Convection and outflow increased the next day, and the system moved slowly westward due to a ridge over Japan. After further organization, the JTWC initiated advisories on July 20 while the depression was just southwest of Iwo Jima. Shortly thereafter, the JMA upgraded the depression into a tropical storm named "Fung-wong". On July 22, the storm began undergoing the Fujiwhara effect with the larger Typhoon Fengshen to the east, causing Fung-wong to turn southwestward. Around that time, the storm entered the Philippine Area of Responsibility, earning it the local name "Kaka". Fung-wong quickly intensified after developing a small eye, becoming a typhoon on July 23, with peak winds of 130 km/h (81 mph). It turned to the south and later southeast while interacting with the larger Fengshen, which passed north of it. On July 25, the typhoon weakened to a severe tropical storm while at the southernmost point of its track. The storm turned to the north and completed a large loop between the Ryukyu and Northern Marianas Islands that day. The combination of cooler waters, wind shear, and dry air caused weakening, and the storm deteriorated into a tropical depression on July 27. Passing a short distance south of Kyushu, Fung-wong dissipated later that day.

The storm dropped heavy rainfall in Japan, reaching 717 mm (28.2 in) at a station in Miyazaki Prefecture. The rains caused two landslides and resulted in delays to bus and train systems, as well as cancellations to ferry and airline routes. There was also minor crop damage.

=== Tropical Storm Kalmaegi ===
- Tropical storm (JMA)
- Tropical depression (SSHWS)
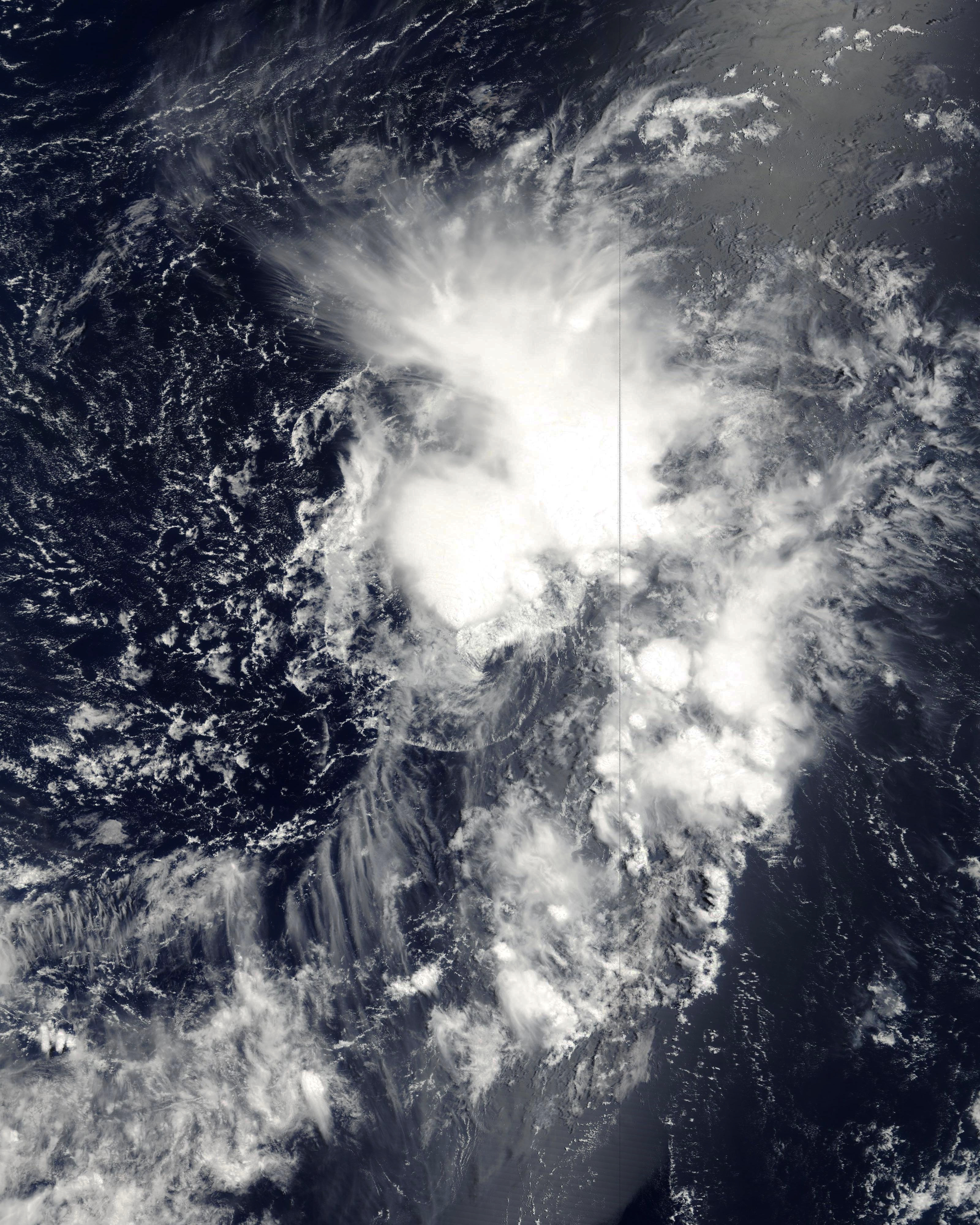
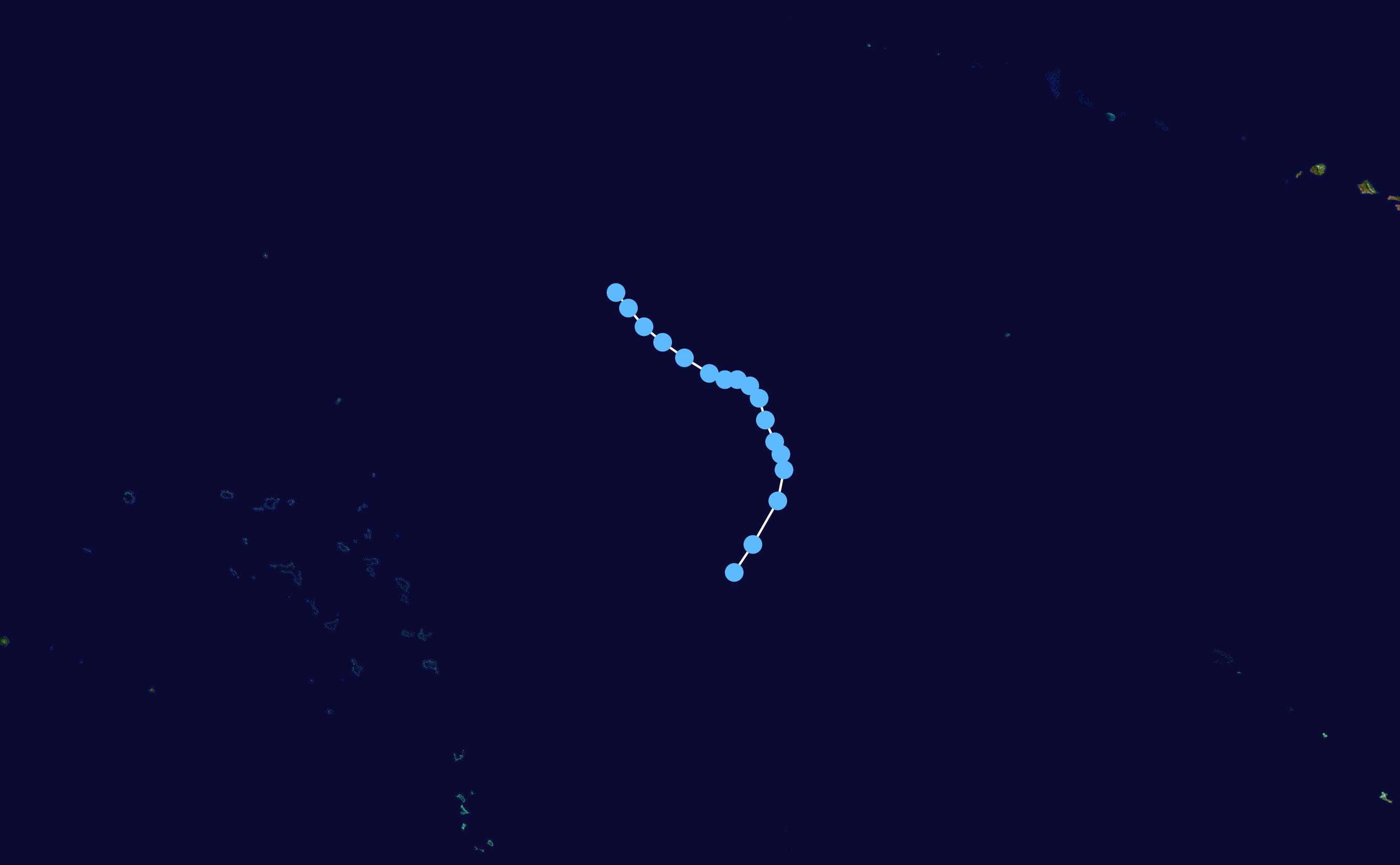
- Duration: July 20 (entered basin) – July 21
- Peak intensity: 65 km/h (40 mph) (10-min); 1002 hPa (mbar)

A tropical disturbance developed on July 17 in the Central Pacific Ocean, near the International Date Line. Deep convection with outflow persisted around a circulation, and at 06:00 UTC on July 20 the JMA classified the system as a tropical depression, just east of the date line and about 980 km (610 mi) west-southwest of Johnston Atoll. The system crossed the line shortly thereafter and quickly intensified into Tropical Storm Kalmaegi. The JMA classified the system as a tropical storm, although the JTWC maintained it as a tropical depression. Kalmaegi moved northwestward due to a ridge to the north, and initially a tropical upper tropospheric trough provided favorable conditions. However, the trough soon increased wind shear and restricted outflow, which caused quick weakening. The thunderstorms diminished from the circulation, and around 12:00 UTC on July 22, Kalmaegi dissipated about 30 hours after forming.

=== Severe Tropical Storm Kammuri (Lagalag) ===
- Severe tropical storm (JMA)
- Tropical storm (SSHWS)
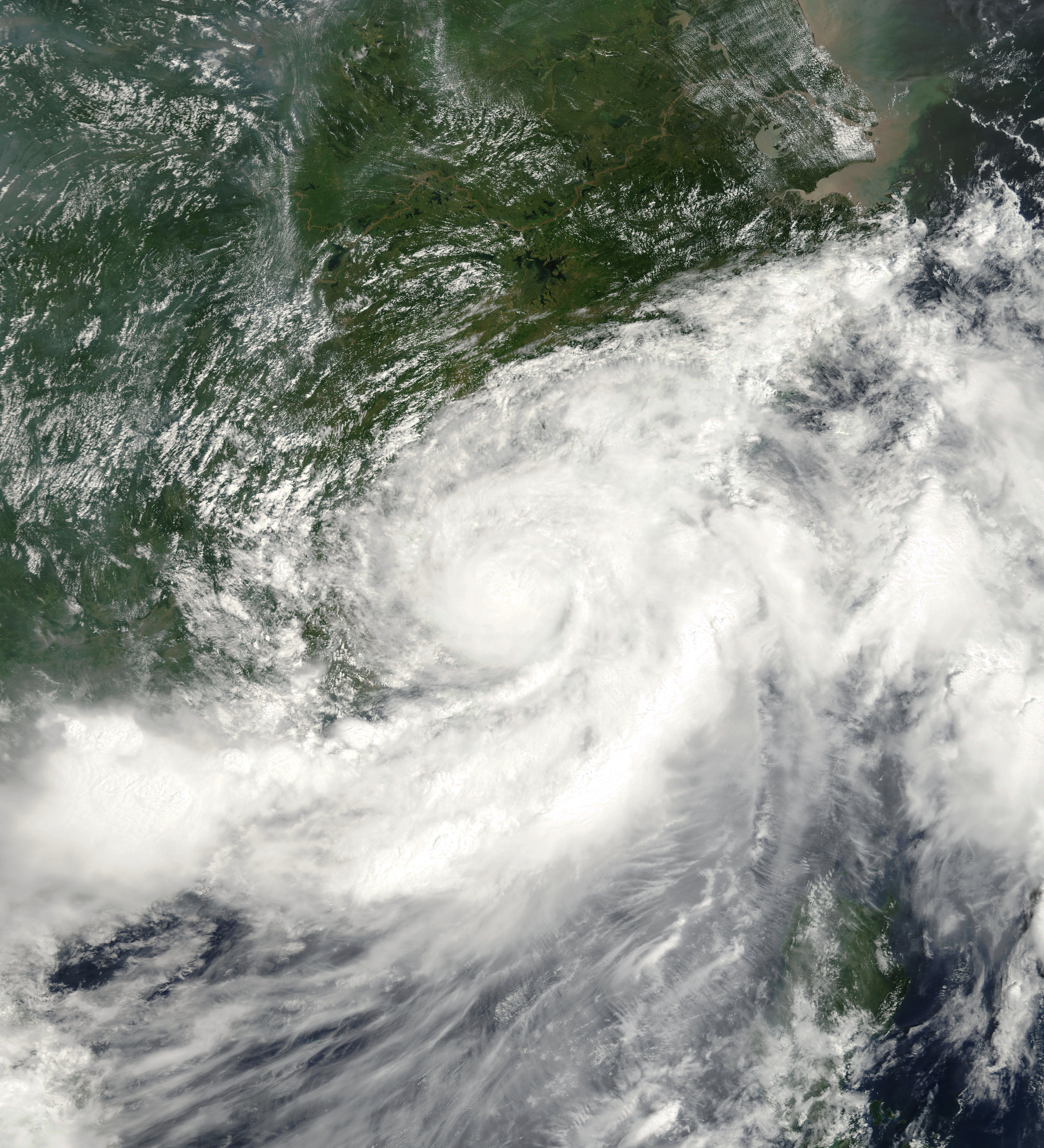
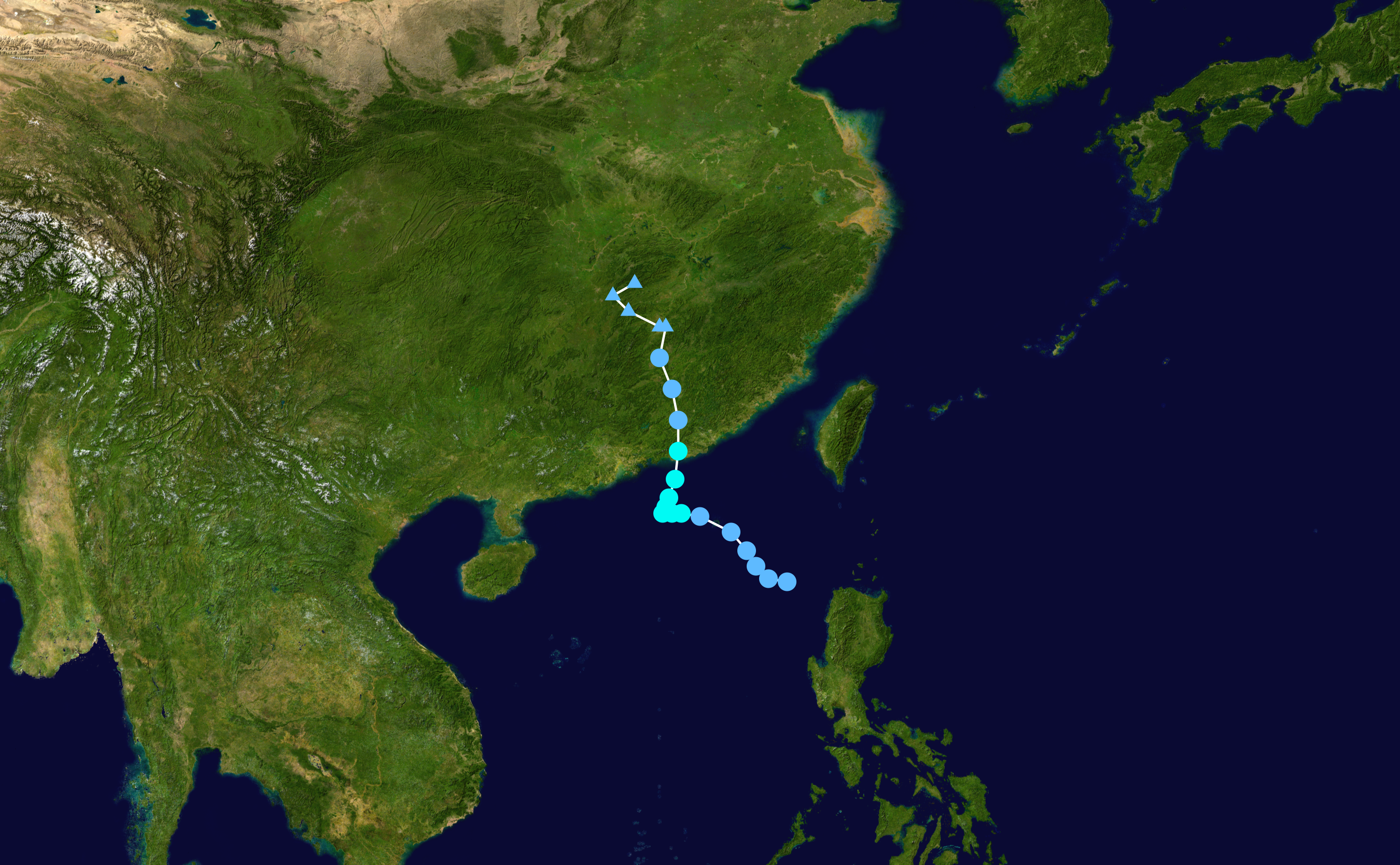
- Duration: August 2 – August 7
- Peak intensity: 100 km/h (65 mph) (10-min); 980 hPa (mbar)

A large monsoonal system persisted toward the end of July 2002 near the Philippines. On August 2, a tropical depression formed off the northwest coast of Luzon and moved west-northwestward. Late on August 3, it intensified into Tropical Storm Kammuri off the coast of Hong Kong. A weakening ridge turned the storm northward toward the coast of China. Tropical Storm Kammuri made landfall late on August 4, after reaching peak winds of 100 km/h (62 mph). The system dissipated over the mountainous coastline of eastern China and merged with a cold front on August 7.

High rainfall from Kammuri affected large portions of China, particularly in Guangdong province where it moved ashore. In Hong Kong, the rains caused a landslide and damaged a road. Two dams were destroyed in Guangdong by the flooding, and 10 people were killed by a landslide. Throughout the province, over 100,000 people had to evacuate due to flooding, and after 6,810 houses were destroyed. The floods damaged roads, railroads, and tunnels, and left power and water outages across the region. Rainfall was beneficial in alleviating drought conditions in Guangdong, although further inland the rains occurred after months of deadly flooding. In Hunan Province, the storm's remnants merged with a cold front and destroyed 12,400 houses. Across its path, the floods damaged or destroyed 245,000 houses, and destroyed about 60 hectares (150 acres) of crop fields. Kammuri and its remnants killed 153 people, and damage was estimated at $509 million (¥4.219 billion CNY).

=== Typhoon Phanfone ===
- Very strong typhoon (JMA)
- Category 4 super typhoon (SSHWS)
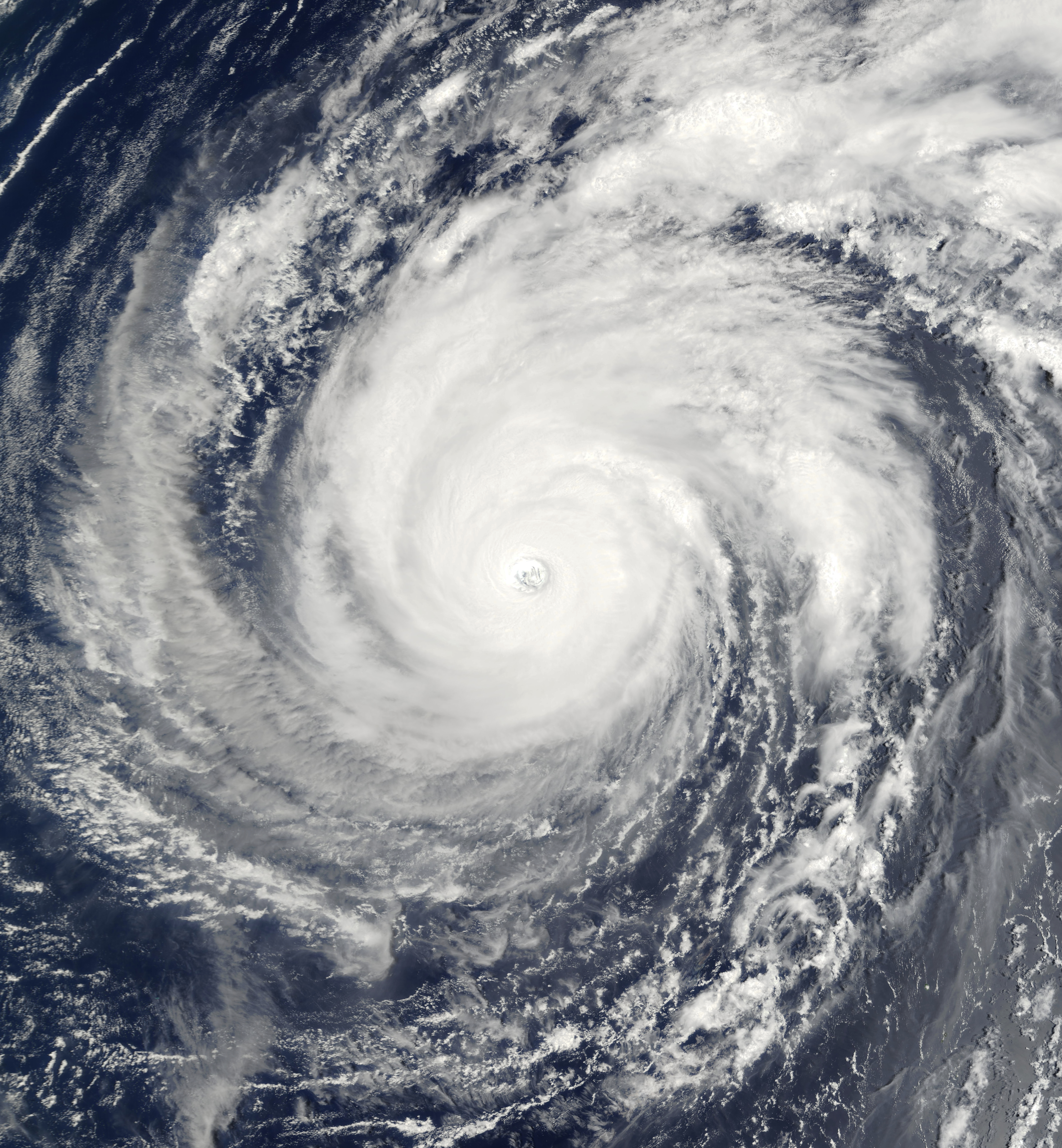
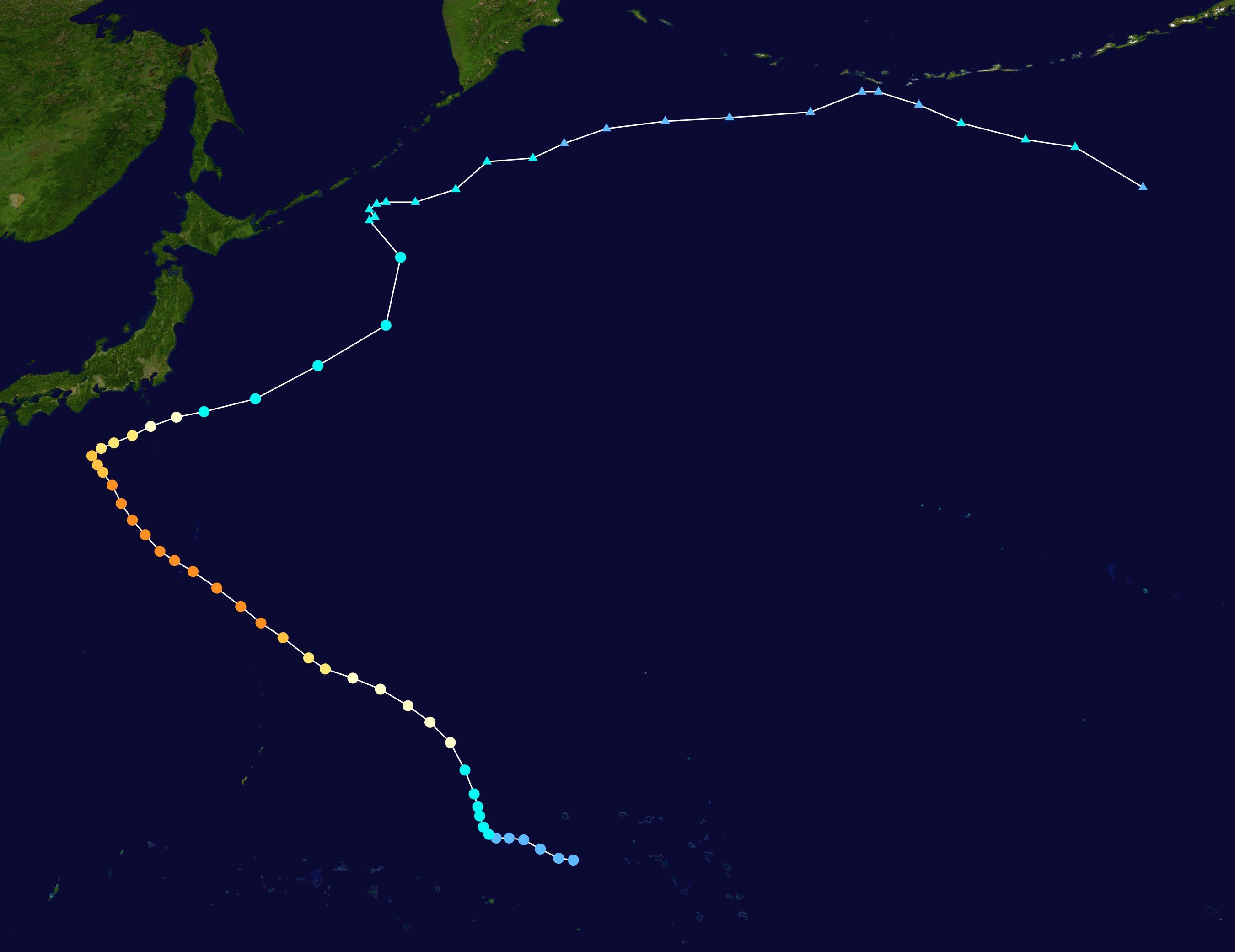
- Duration: August 11 – August 20
- Peak intensity: 155 km/h (100 mph) (10-min); 940 hPa (mbar)

The monsoon trough spawned a tropical depression on August 11, just west of Ujelang Atoll. It moved generally northwestward due to a ridge to the north, quickly intensifying into Tropical Storm Phanfone by August 12. With good outflow and developing rainbands, the storm continued to strengthen, becoming a typhoon on August 14. Phanfone developed a well-defined eye, surrounded by deep convection. On August 15, the JMA estimated 10-minute winds of 155 km/h (96 mph), and the JTWC estimated 1-minute winds of 250 km/h (160 mph), making it a super typhoon. Diminished outflow and an eyewall replacement cycle caused weakening, and it passed near Iwo Jima on August 16. Phanfone turned to the northeast two days later due to a weakening ridge, and dry air caused rapid deterioration. Passing southeast of Japan, it fell to tropical storm status on August 19 before becoming extratropical the next day; the remnants continued to the northeast and crossed the International Date Line on August 25.

Wind gusts on Iwo Jima reached 168 km/h (104 mph). Rainfall in mainland Japan peaked at 416 mm (16.4 in) near Tokyo, and the typhoon flooded 43 houses. High rains caused road damage and landslides, as well as some aquaculture damage. The storm caused 22 ferry routes and 10 flights to be canceled, and temporarily shut down refineries near Tokyo. On the offshore island of Hachijō-jima, high winds caused a temporary power outage.

=== Tropical Storm Vongfong ===
- Tropical storm (JMA)
- Tropical storm (SSHWS)
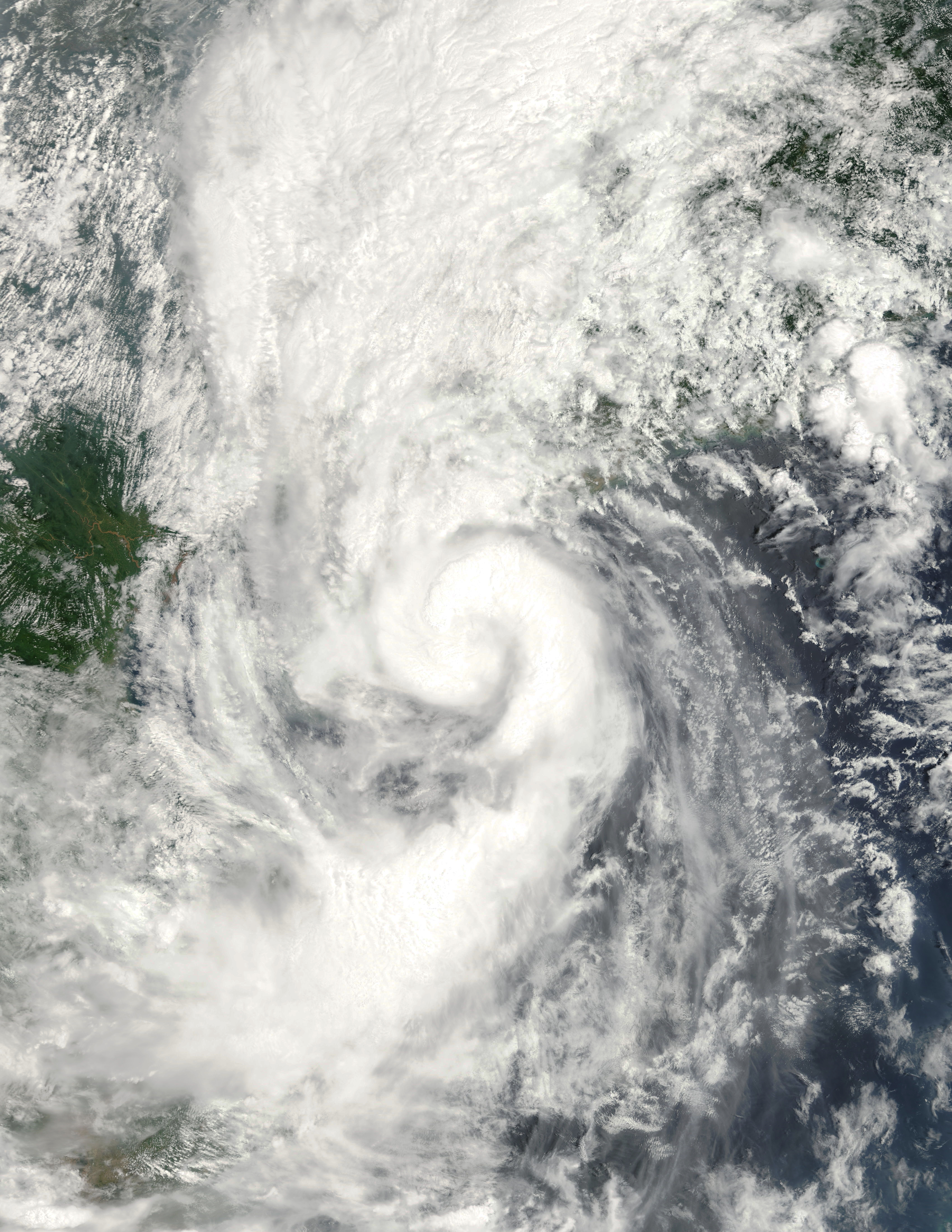
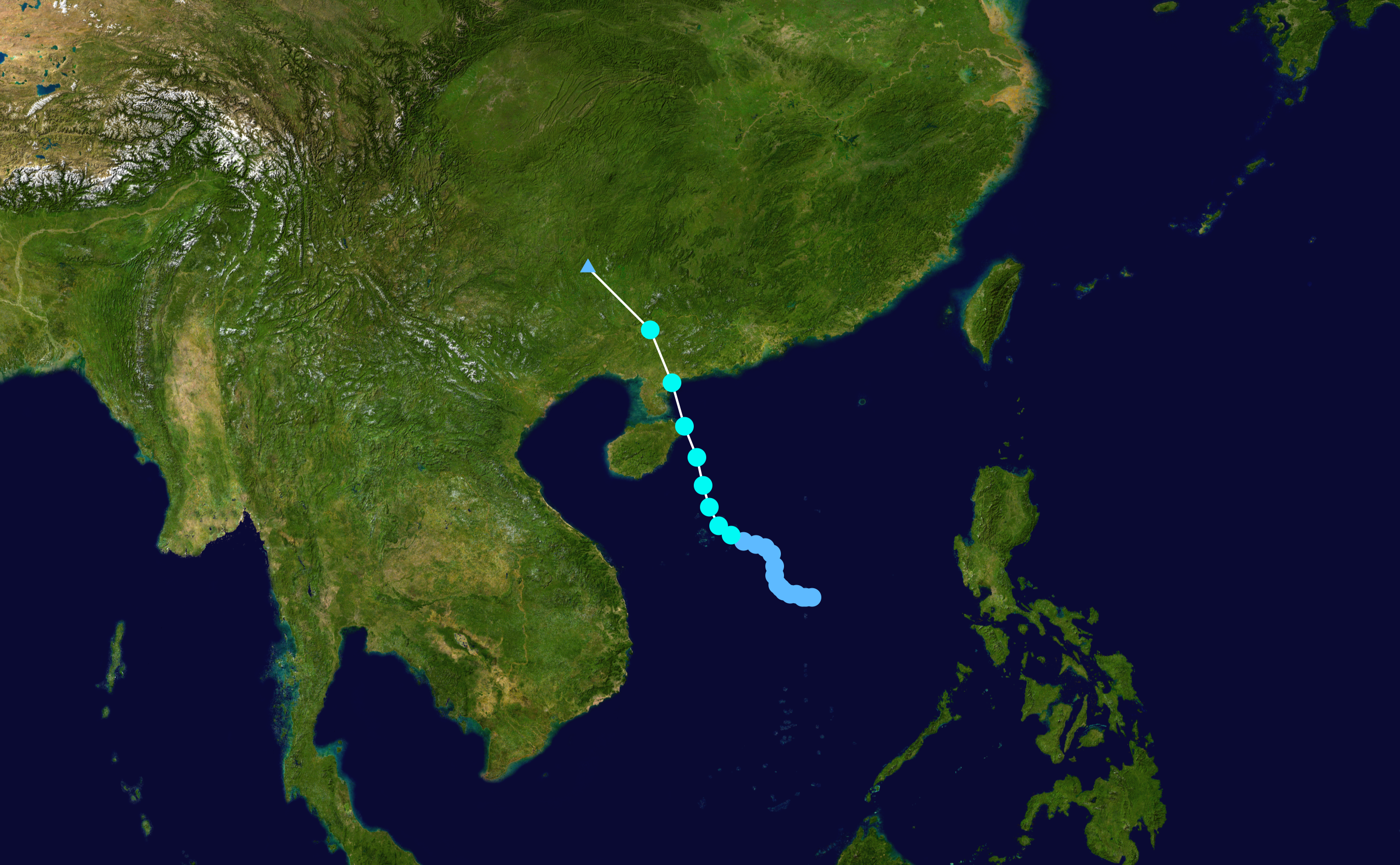
- Duration: August 15 – August 20
- Peak intensity: 75 km/h (45 mph) (10-min); 985 hPa (mbar)

A tropical depression formed in the South China Sea during August 15 from the remnants of 18W. It moved northwestward, strengthening into Tropical Storm Vongfong on August 18. It brushed eastern Hainan before making landfall on August 19 in southern China near Wuchuan, Guangdong. Soon after the circulation dissipated, it dropped heavy rainfall across the region. One person died in a traffic accident in Hong Kong, and landslides killed twelve people. The storm destroyed 6,000 houses, mostly in Guangdong, and damage in the country totaled at least $86 million.

=== Typhoon Rusa ===
- Typhoon (JMA)
- Category 4 typhoon (SSHWS)
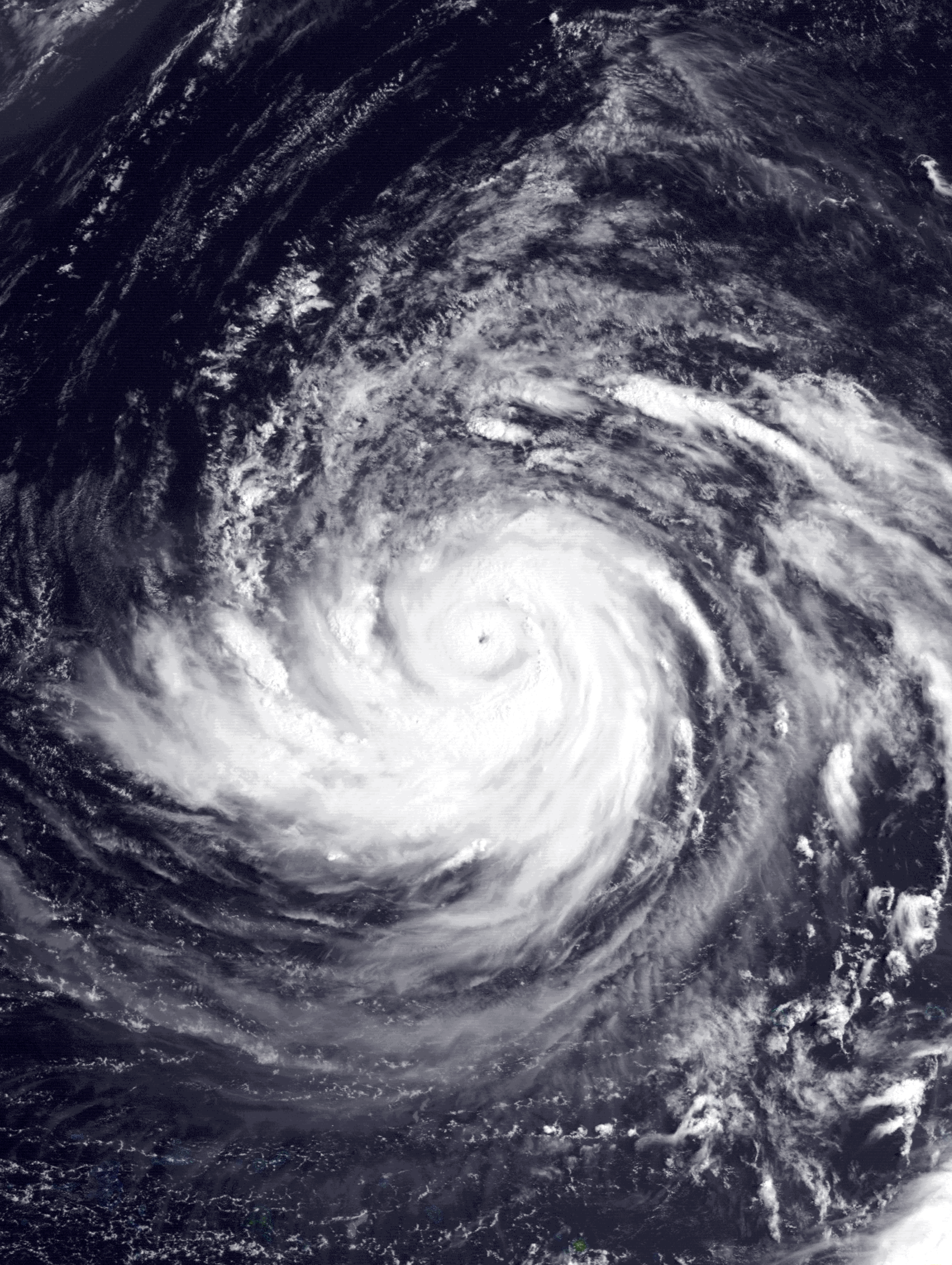
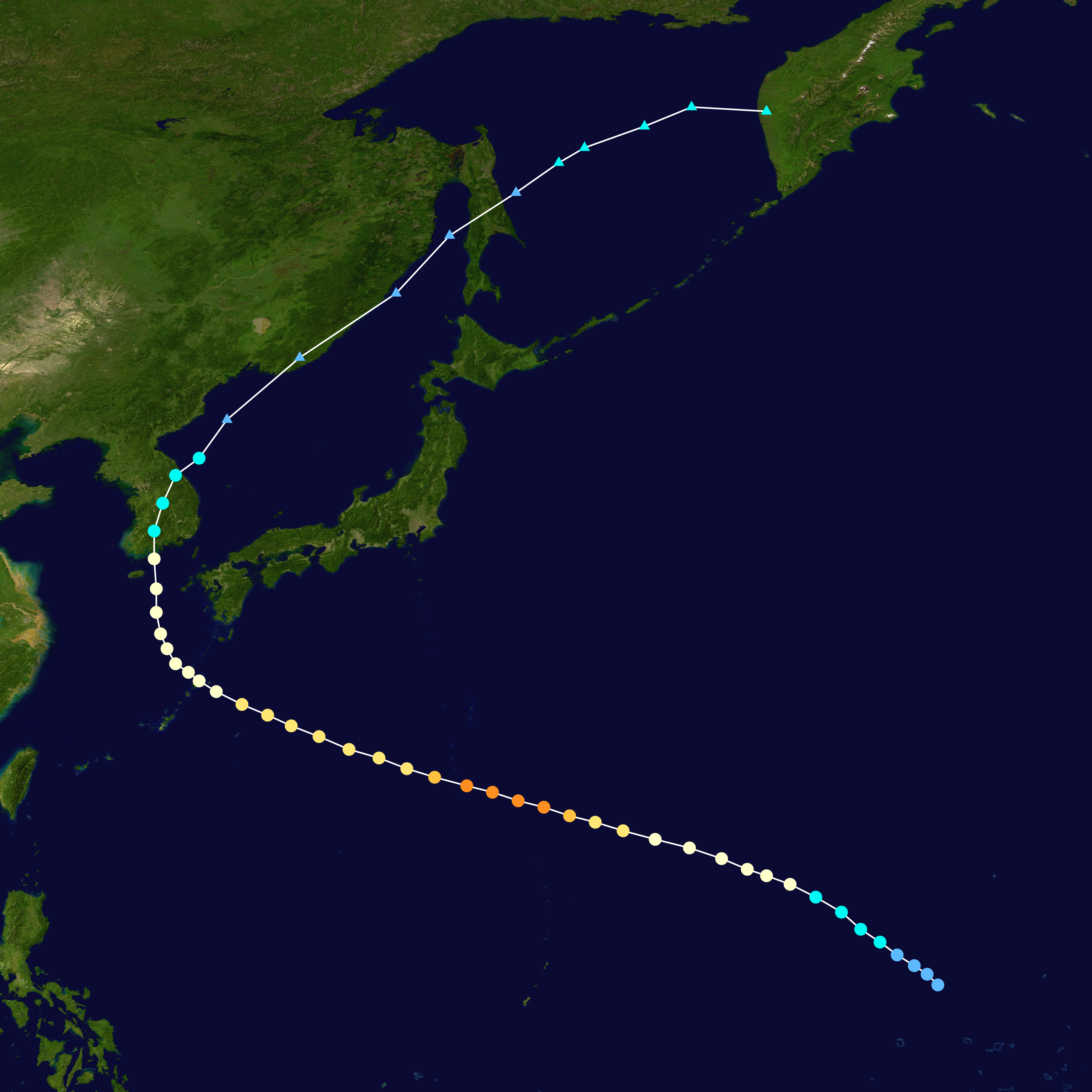
- Duration: August 22 – September 1
- Peak intensity: 150 km/h (90 mph) (10-min); 950 hPa (mbar)

Typhoon Rusa developed on August 22 from the monsoon trough in the open Pacific Ocean, well to the southeast of Japan. For several days, Rusa moved to the northwest, eventually intensifying into a powerful typhoon. The JMA estimated peak 10-minute winds of 150 km/h (93 mph), and the JTWC estimated peak 1-minute winds of 215 km/h (134 mph). On August 26, the storm moved across the Amami Islands of Japan, where Rusa left 20,000 people without power and caused two fatalities. Across Japan, the typhoon dropped torrential rainfall peaking at 902 mm (35.5 in) in Tokushima Prefecture.

After weakening slightly, Rusa made landfall on Goheung, South Korea with 10-minute winds of 140 km/h (87 mph). It was able to maintain much of its intensity due to warm air and instability from a nearby cold front. Rusa weakened while moving through the country, dropping heavy rainfall that peaked at 897.5 mm (35.33 in) in Gangneung. A 24-hour total of 880 mm (35 in) in the city broke the record for the highest daily precipitation in the country; however, the heaviest rainfall was localized. Over 17,000 houses were damaged, and large areas of crop fields were flooded. In South Korea, Rusa killed at least 233 people, making it the deadliest typhoon in over 43 years, and caused $4.2 billion in damage. The typhoon also dropped heavy rainfall in neighboring North Korea, leaving 26,000 people homeless and killing three. Rusa also destroyed large areas of crops in the country, which was already affected by ongoing famine conditions. The typhoon became extratropical over eastern Russia on September 1, dissipating three days later.

=== Typhoon Sinlaku ===
- Typhoon (JMA)
- Category 3 typhoon (SSHWS)
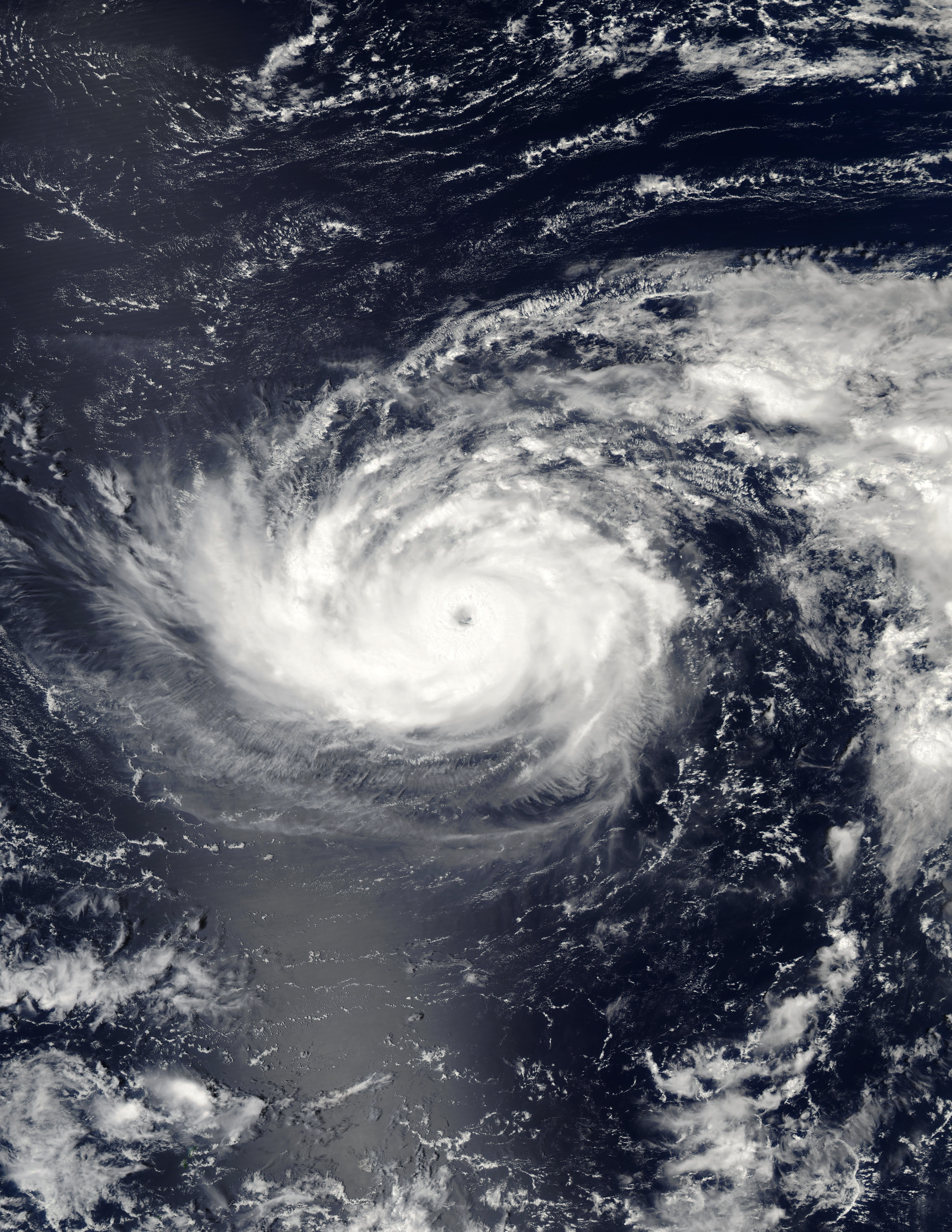
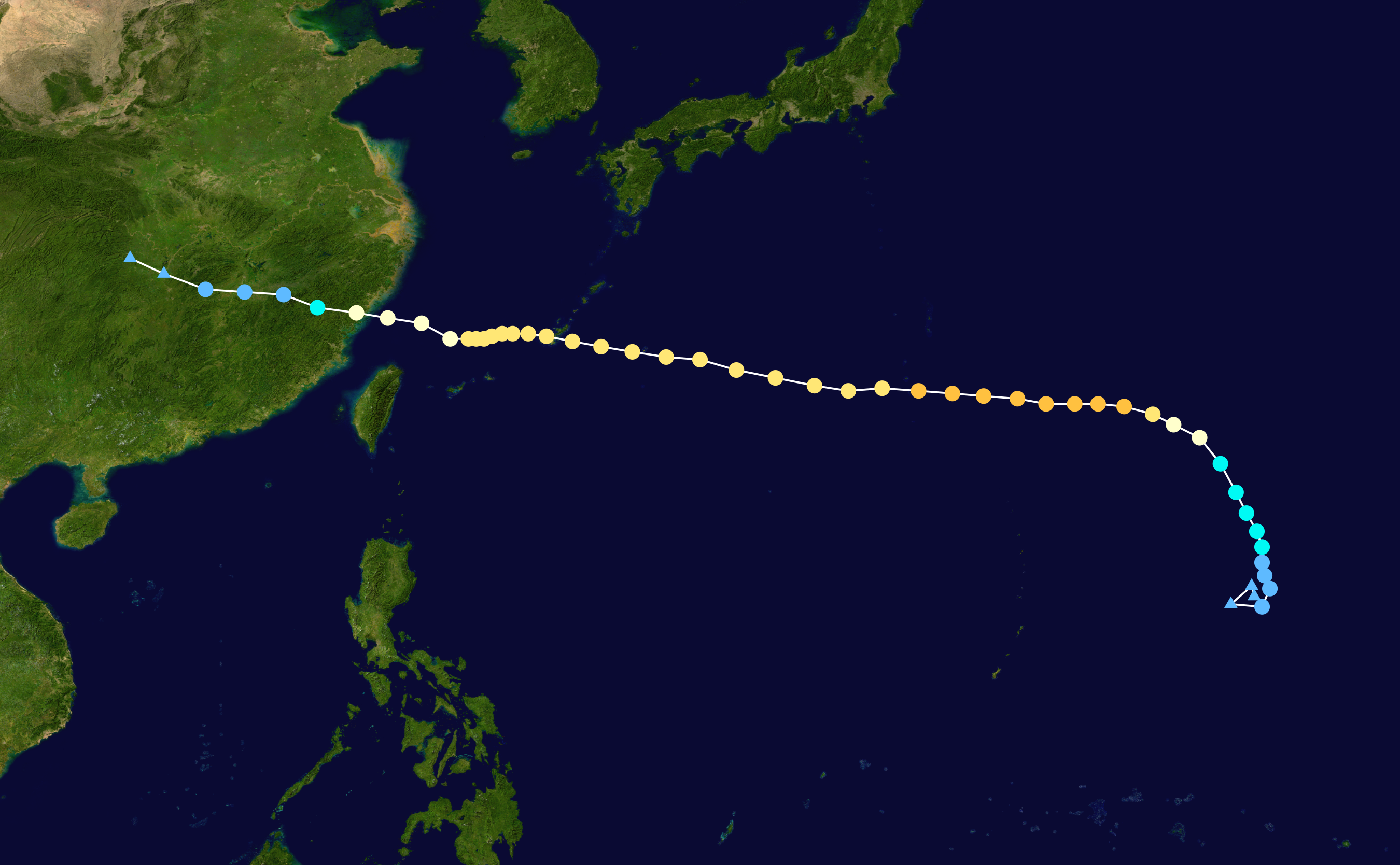
- Duration: August 27 – September 9
- Peak intensity: 150 km/h (90 mph) (10-min); 950 hPa (mbar)

Sinlaku formed on August 27 northeast of the Northern Marianas Islands. After initially moving to the north, it began a generally westward motion that it maintained for the rest of its duration. Sinlaku strengthened into a typhoon and attained its peak winds on August 31. Over the next few days, it fluctuated slightly in intensity while moving over or near several Japanese islands. On September 4, the typhoon's eye crossed over Okinawa. It dropped heavy rainfall and produced strong winds that left over 100,000 people without power. Damage on the island was estimated at $14.3 million, including $3.6 million in damage to Kadena Air Base.

After affecting Okinawa, Sinlaku threatened northern Taiwan, which had been affected by two deadly typhoons in the previous year. Damage ended up being minimal on the island, although two people were killed. Sinlaku weakened slightly before making its final landfall in eastern China near Wenzhou on September 7. The storm produced a record wind gust there of 204 km/h (127 mph), and just south of the city, high waves destroyed several piers and a large boat. High rainfall and winds from Sinlaku wrecked 58,000 houses, and large areas of crops were destroyed. Damage in China was estimated at $709 million, and there were 28 deaths there.

=== Typhoon Ele ===
- Very strong typhoon (JMA)
- Category 4 typhoon (SSHWS)
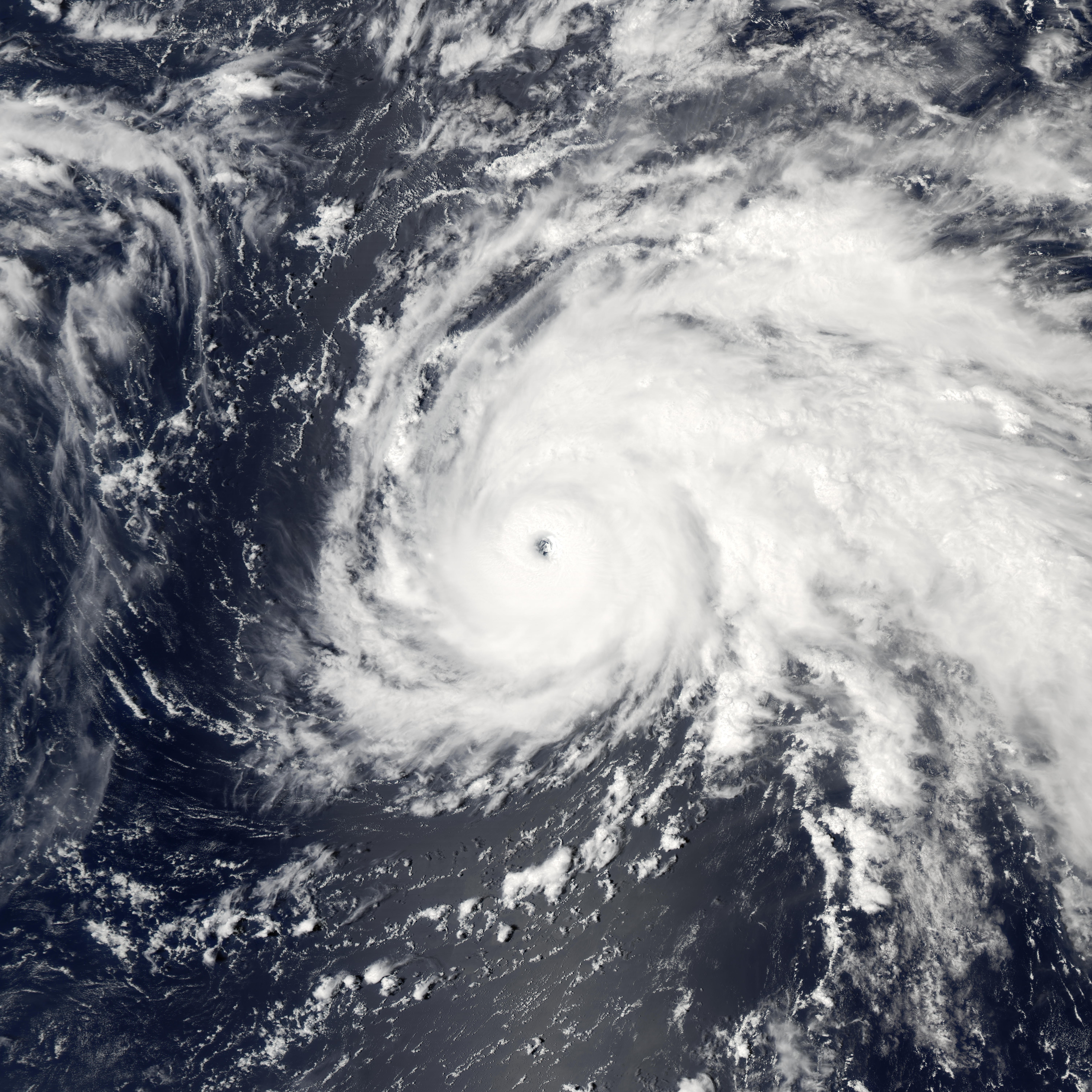
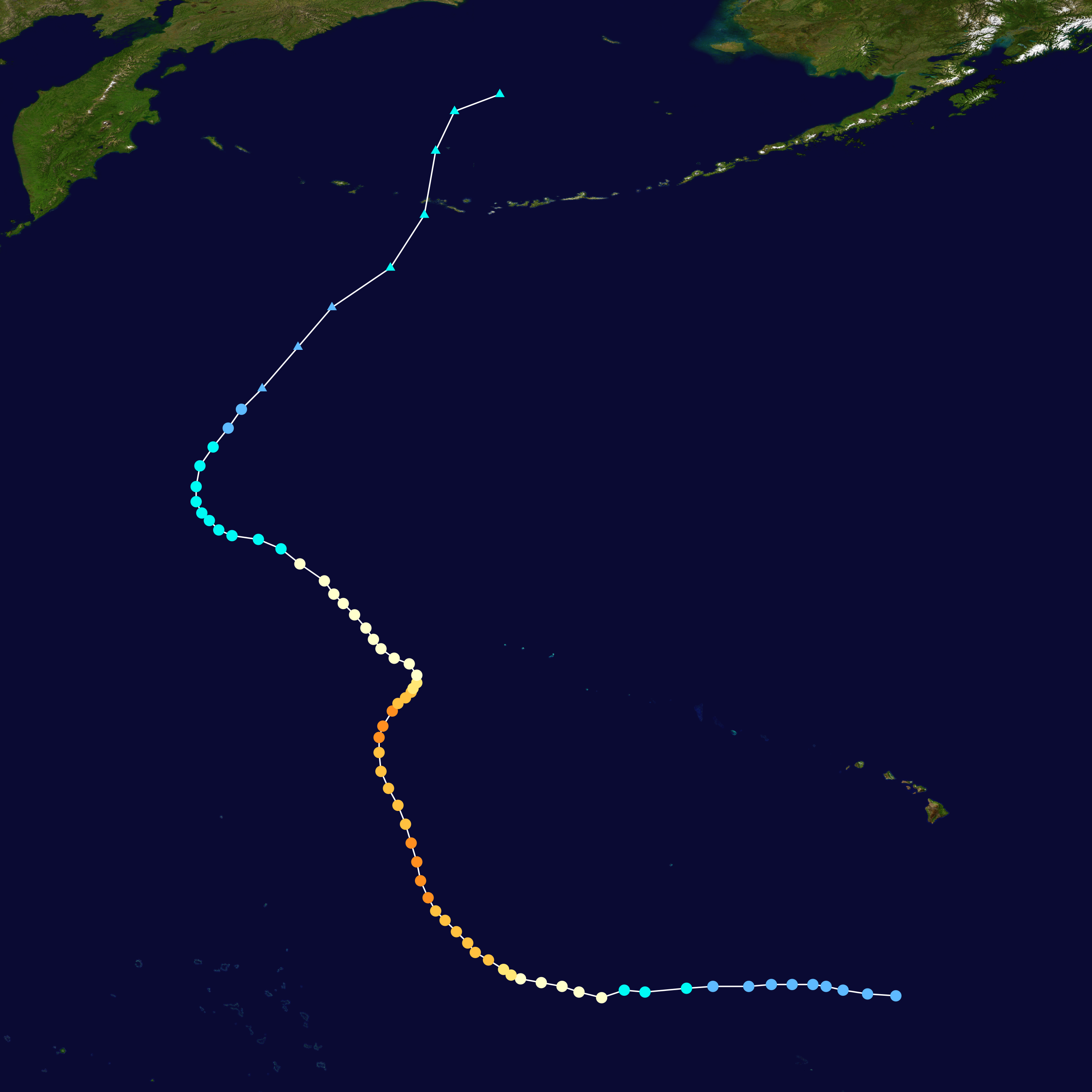
- Duration: August 30 (entered basin) – September 10
- Peak intensity: 165 km/h (105 mph) (10-min); 940 hPa (mbar)

An eastern extension of the monsoon trough southwest of Hawaii organized into Tropical Depression Two-C on August 27 and strengthened into Tropical Storm Ele six hours later. Despite the nearby presence of Alika, Ele developed rapidly and strengthened into a hurricane on August 28. After contributing to the demise of Alika, Ele intensified to winds of 205 km/h (127 mph) before crossing the International Date Line on August 30.

Reclassified as a typhoon, Ele moved north-northwestward due to a weakness in the ridge to the north. Early on August 31, the JTWC estimated the storm's peak 1-minute winds at 165 km/h (103 mph). On September 2, the JMA estimated peak 10-minute winds of 165 km/h (103 mph) while Ele was northeast of Wake Atoll. The typhoon turned to the northeast due to an approaching trough, although Ele resumed its previous north-northwest motion after a ridge built behind the trough. It gradually weakened due to cooler waters and increasing wind shear, and on September 6 Ele deteriorated below typhoon status. The thunderstorms became detached from the circulation, causing Ele to weaken to a tropical depression late on September 9. By that time, it began moving to the northeast, and on September 10 it transitioned into an extratropical storm. The remnants of Ele continued to the northeast until moving back into the central Pacific as an extratropical storm on September 11 and dissipating on September 13.

=== Tropical Storm Hagupit ===
- Tropical storm (JMA)
- Tropical storm (SSHWS)
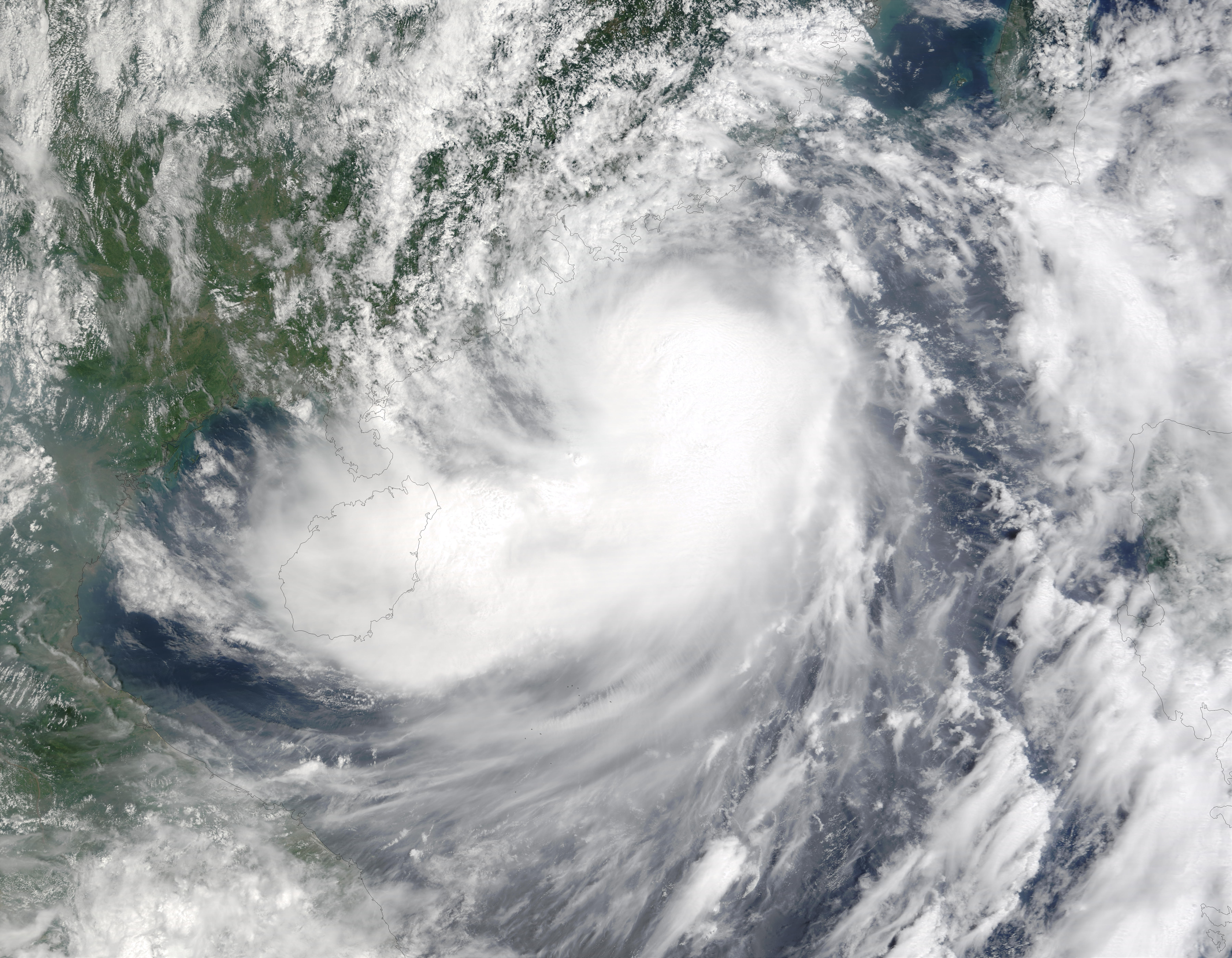
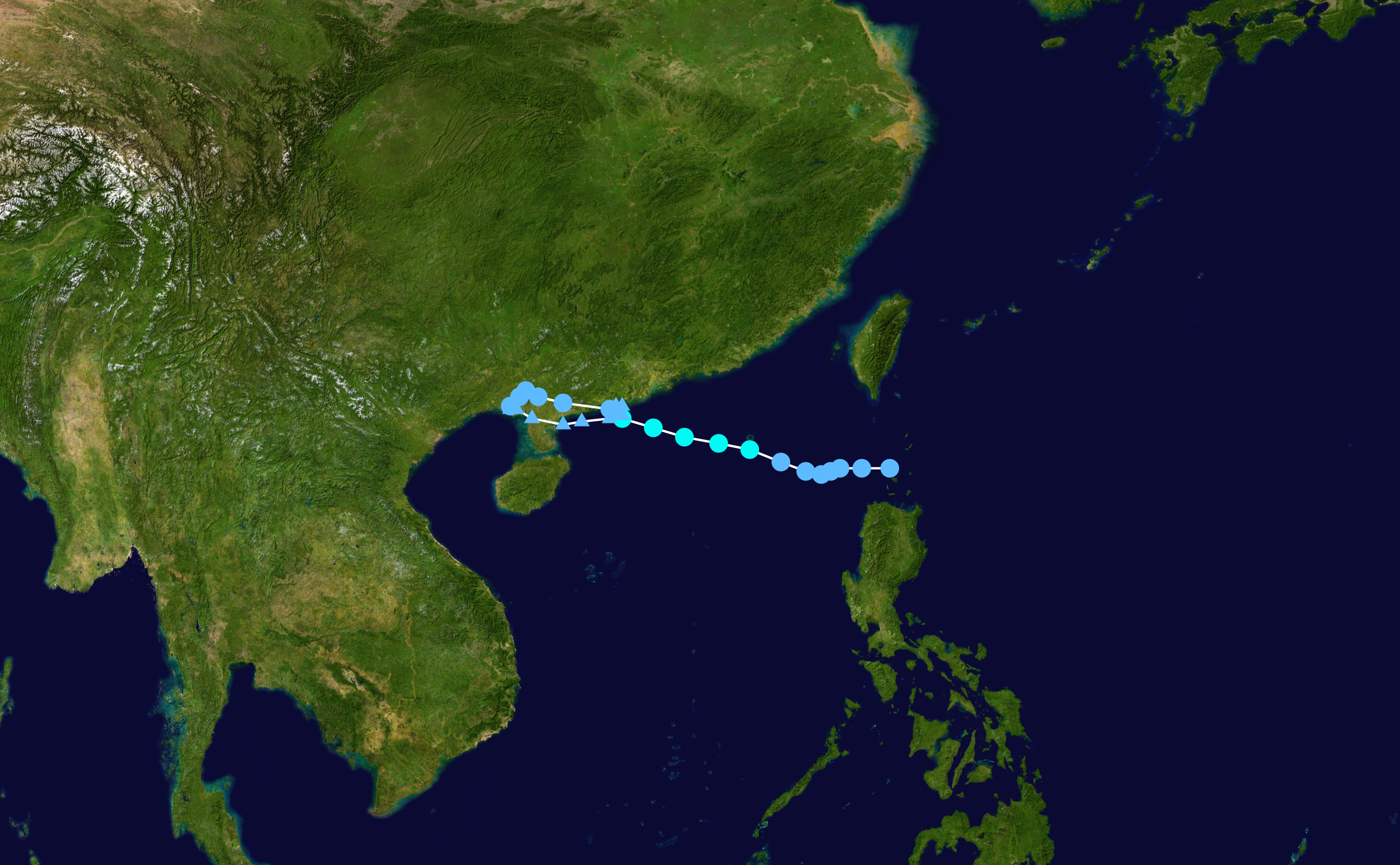
- Duration: September 9 – September 16
- Peak intensity: 85 km/h (50 mph) (10-min); 990 hPa (mbar)

An area of convection developed on September 8 to the northeast of Luzon. Moving to the west due to a ridge to the north, it slowly organized, forming into a tropical depression on September 9 in the South China Sea. As it approached southeastern China, the depression intensified into Tropical Storm Hagupit and reached peak winds of 85 km/h (53 mph). At around 19:00 UTC on September 11, the storm made landfall west of Macau and quickly weakened into a tropical depression. The JTWC promptly discontinued advisories, although the JMA continued tracking Hagupit over land. The remnants executed a loop over Guangdong before moving offshore and dissipating on September 16 near Hong Kong.

Hagupit dropped heavy rainfall along the coast of China for several days, peaking at 344 mm (13.5 in) in Zhanjiang City. The rains flooded widespread areas of crop fields and resulted in landslides. In Guangdong, 330 houses were destroyed, and damage was estimated at $32.5 million. In Hong Kong, 32 people were injured due to the storm, and 41 flights were canceled. In Fuzhou in Fujian Province, thunderstorms related to Hagupit flooded hundreds of houses. Further west in Jiangxi, floods from the storm destroyed 3,800 houses, ruined 180 bridges, and killed 25. Offshore, a helicopter rescued the crew of 25 from a sunken boat during the storm.

=== Tropical Storm Changmi ===
- Tropical storm (JMA)
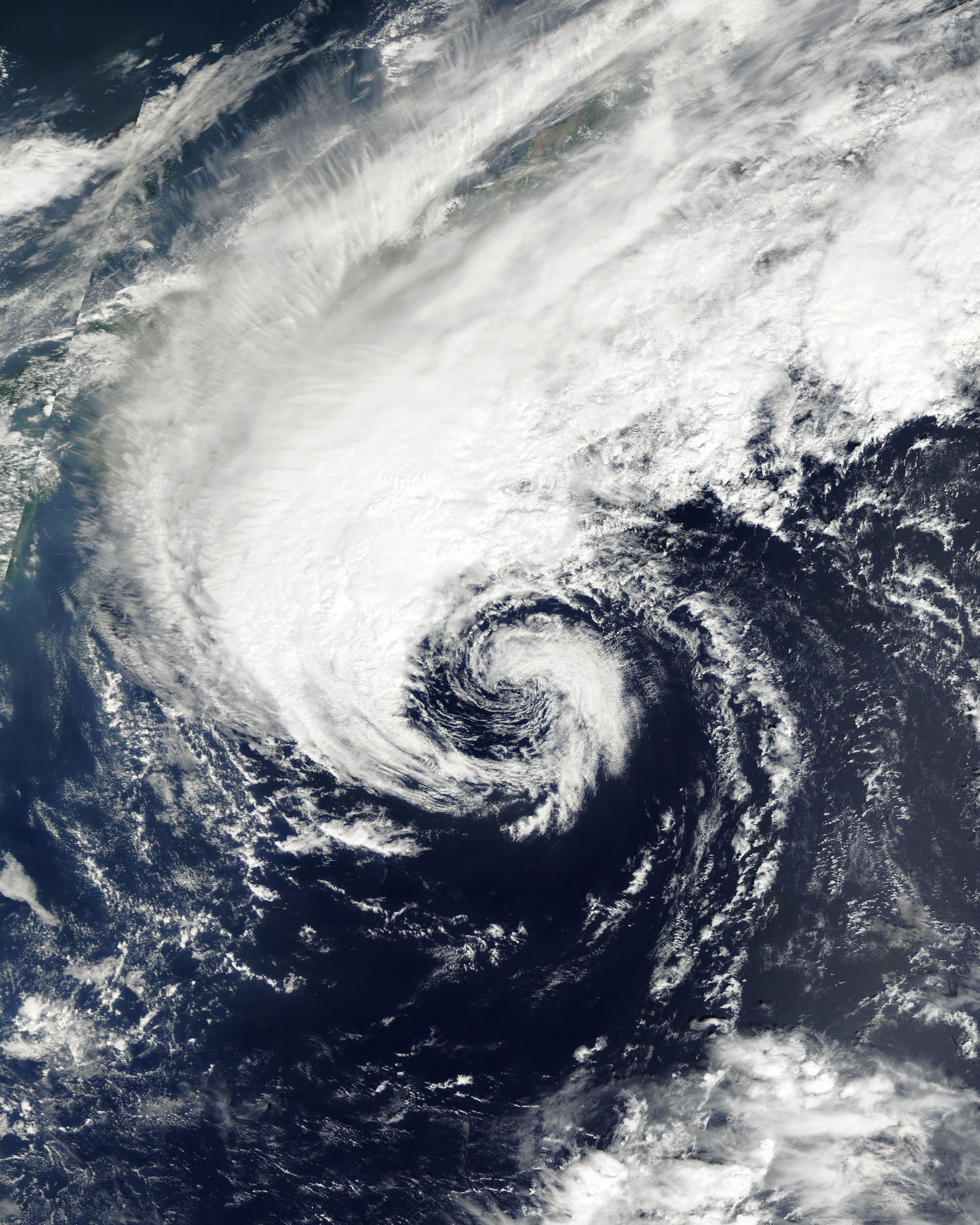
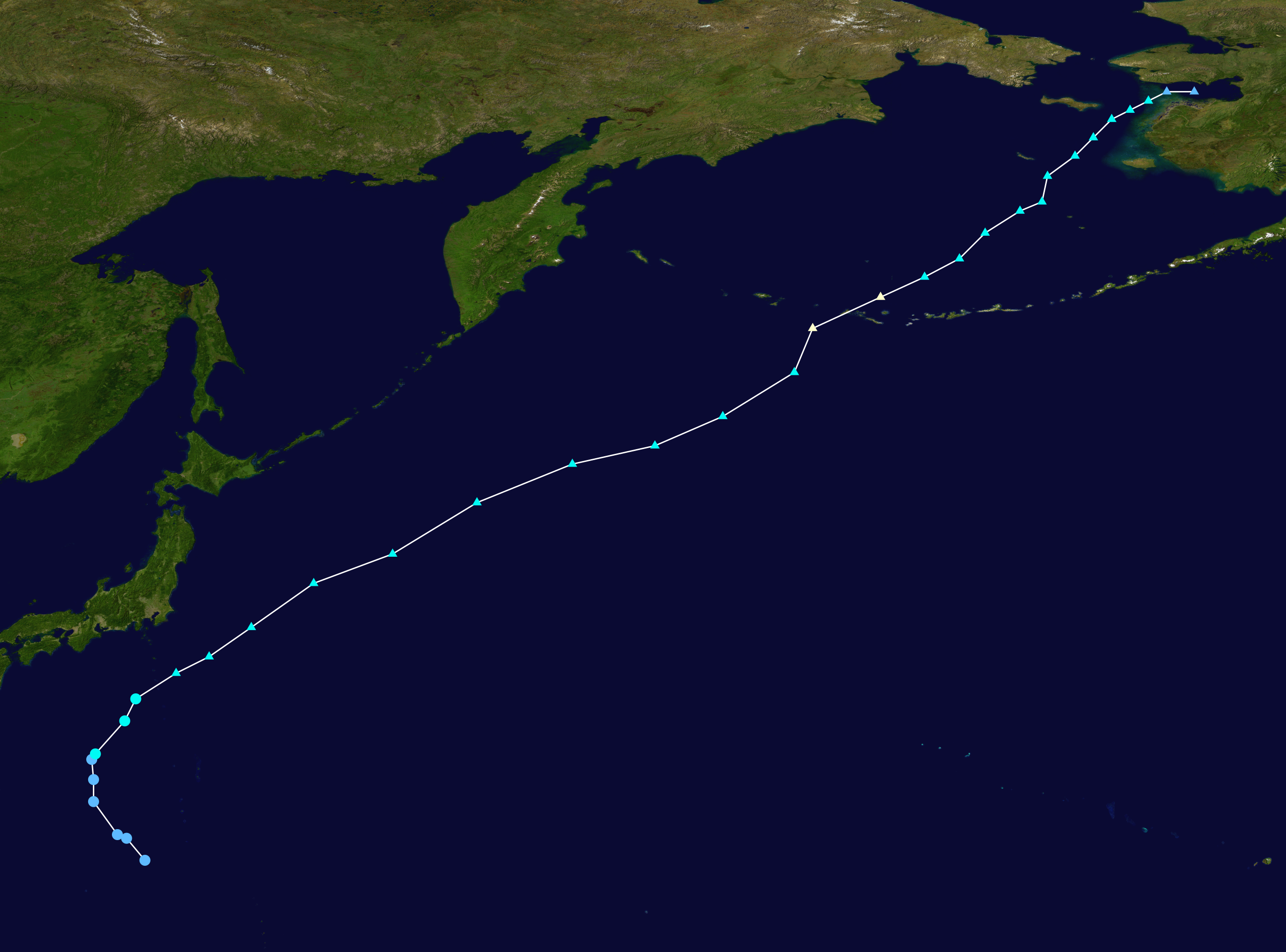
- Duration: September 20 – September 22
- Peak intensity: 85 km/h (50 mph) (10-min); 985 hPa (mbar)

An area of thunderstorms increased near the FSM on September 15 within the monsoon trough. Located within an area of moderate wind shear, its convection was intermittent around a weak circulation. On September 18, the JTWC issued a Tropical Cyclone Formation Alert (TCFA), and the JMA classified the system as a tropical depression; however, the two warning agencies were tracking different circulations within the same system, and by September 19 the circulation JMA was tracking became the dominant system. Shortly thereafter, the agency downgraded the system to a low-pressure area after it weakened. The next day, JMA again upgraded the system to a tropical depression, and the JTWC issued a second TCFA when the system had a partially exposed circulation near an area of increasing convection. Late on September 21, the JMA upgraded the depression to Tropical Storm Changmi to the south of Japan. The next day, Changmi attained peak winds of 85 km/h (53 mph). However, the JTWC noted that the system was absorbing dry air and becoming extratropical, and thus did not issue warnings on the storm. Moving northeastward, Changmi became an extratropical cyclone on September 22, and gradually became more intense until crossing the International Date Line early on September 25.

=== Tropical Storm Mekkhala ===
- Tropical storm (JMA)
- Tropical storm (SSHWS)
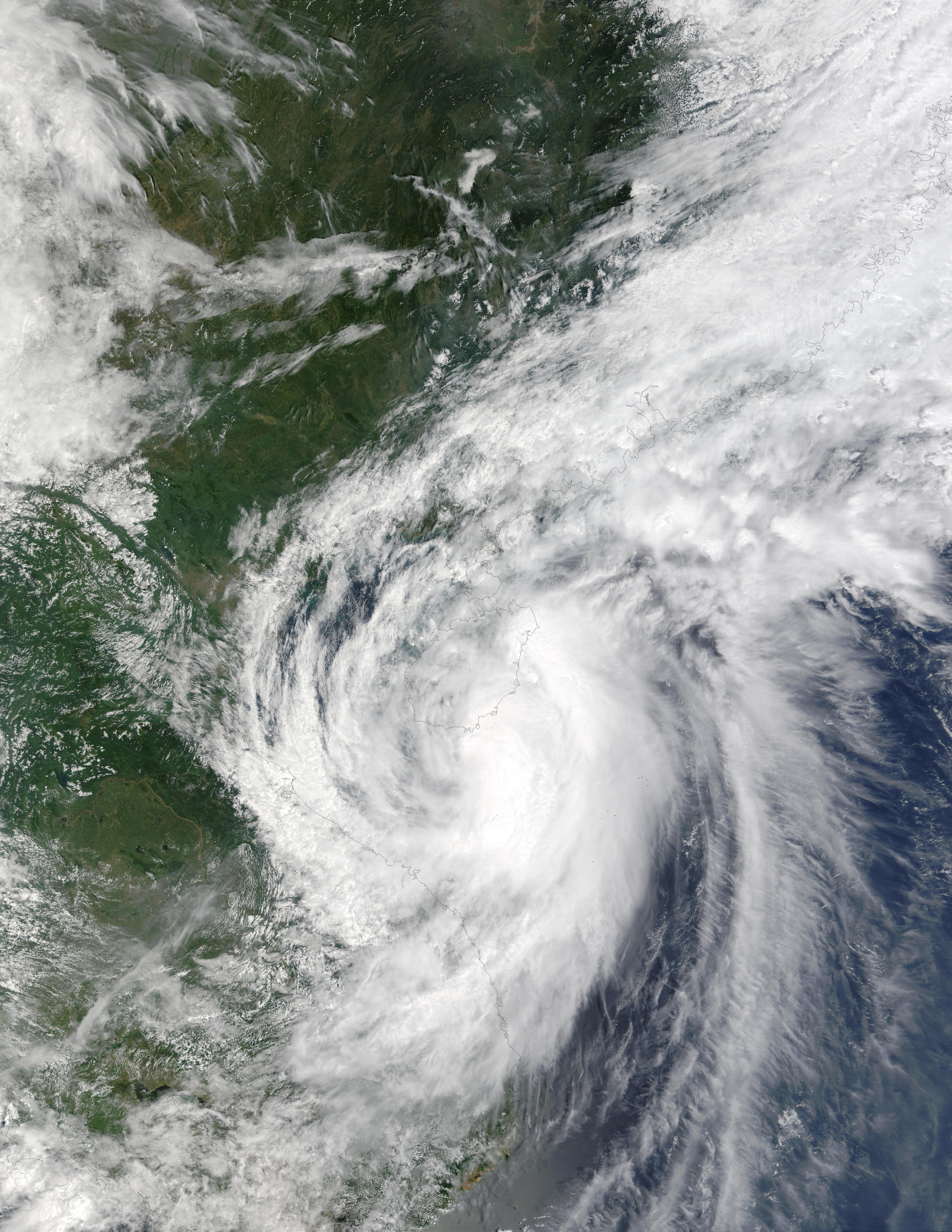
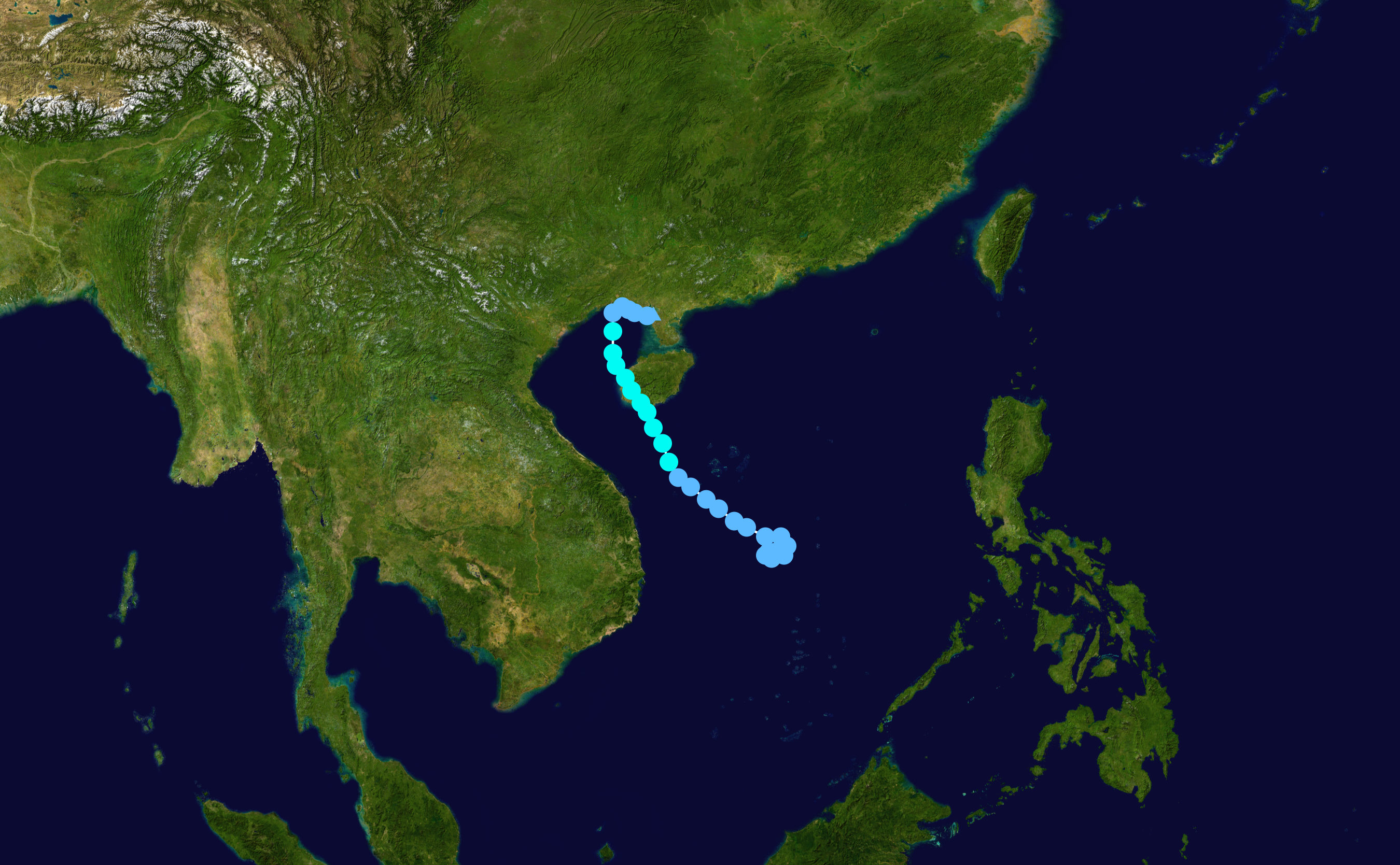
- Duration: September 22 – September 28
- Peak intensity: 85 km/h (50 mph) (10-min); 990 hPa (mbar)

An elongated trough with associated convection developed in the South China Sea by September 21. Light shear and increasing outflow allowed the system to become better organized, and it formed into a tropical depression on September 22 between Vietnam and Luzon. A ridge to the northeast allowed the system to track northwestward. For several days the depression failed to organize further, despite favorable conditions; however, late on September 24 the circulation developed rainbands and a weak eye feature. Early the next day, the JMA upgraded it to Tropical Storm Mekkhala, which quickly intensified to a peak intensity of 85 km/h (53 mph). At around 12:00 UTC on September 25, Mekkhala made landfall on western Hainan near peak intensity. Soon after, it moved into the Gulf of Tonkin and weakened due to land interaction and increasing shear. Mekkhala remained a weak tropical storm until September 28, when it weakened to a tropical depression and dissipated soon after in the extreme northern portion of the Gulf of Tonkin.

Mekkhala dropped heavy rainfall along its path, peaking at 479 mm (18.9 in) in Sanya, Hainan. Along the island, high winds washed ashore or sank 20 boats, and 84 fishermen were rescued. Throughout Hainan, the high rains wrecked 2,500 houses and left $80.5 million in damage. High rains spread into southwestern China, particularly in Guangxi. In Beihai, the storm destroyed 335 houses, resulting in $22 million in damage.

=== Typhoon Higos ===
- Very strong typhoon (JMA)
- Category 4 super typhoon (SSHWS)
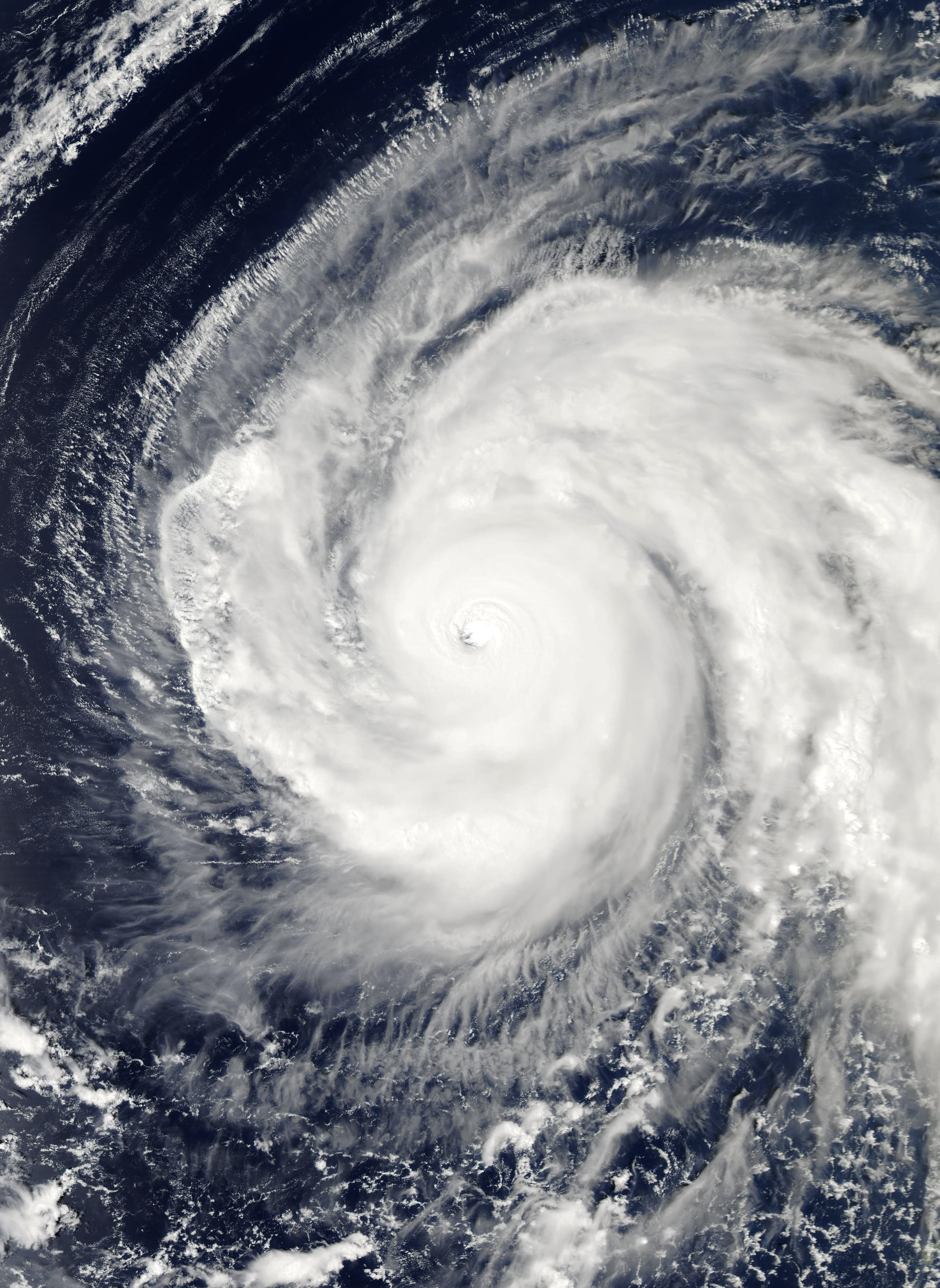
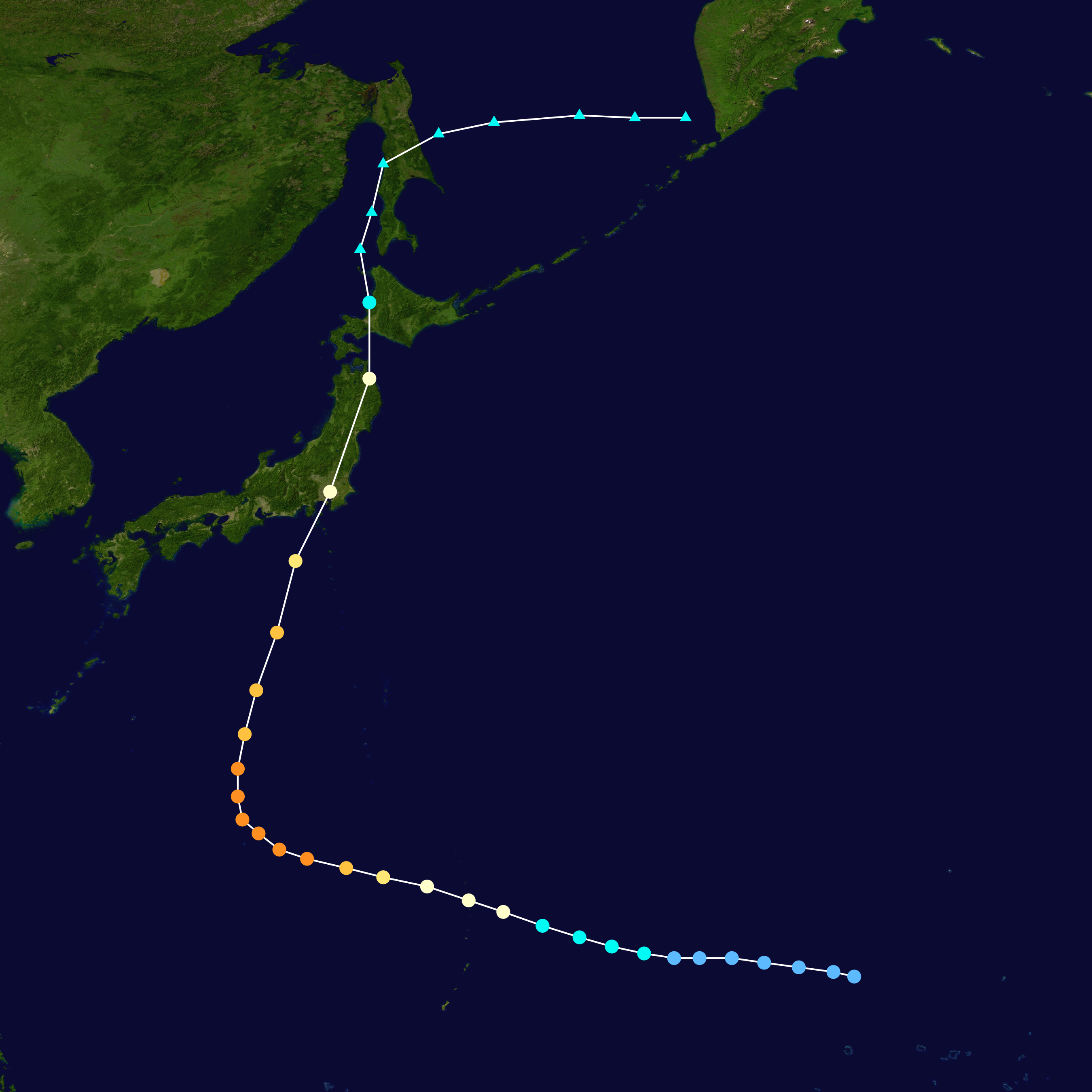
- Duration: September 26 – October 2
- Peak intensity: 175 km/h (110 mph) (10-min); 930 hPa (mbar)

Typhoon Higos developed on September 25 east of the Northern Marianas Islands. It tracked west-northwestward for its first few days, steadily intensifying into a powerful typhoon by September 29. Higos weakened and turned to the north-northeast toward Japan, making landfall in that country's Kanagawa Prefecture on October 1. Shortly thereafter, it crossed over Tokyo, becoming the third strongest typhoon to do so since World War II. It weakened while crossing Honshu, and shortly after striking Hokkaidō on October 2, Higos became extratropical. The remnants passed over Sakhalin and dissipated on October 4.

Before striking Japan, Higos produced strong winds in the Northern Marianas Islands while passing to their north. These winds damaged the food supply on two islands. Later, Higos moved across Japan with wind gusts as strong as 161 km/h (100 mph), including record gusts at several locations. A total of 608,130 buildings in the country were left without power, and two people were electrocuted in the storm's aftermath. The typhoon also dropped heavy rainfall that peaked at 346 mm (13.6 in). The rains flooded houses across the country and caused mudslides. High waves washed 25 boats ashore and killed one person along the coast. Damage in the country totaled $2.14 billion (¥261 billion JPY), and there were five deaths. Later, the remnants of Higos affected the Russian Far East, killing seven people in two shipwrecks near Primorsky Krai.

=== Severe Tropical Storm Bavi ===
- Severe tropical storm (JMA)
- Category 1 typhoon (SSHWS)
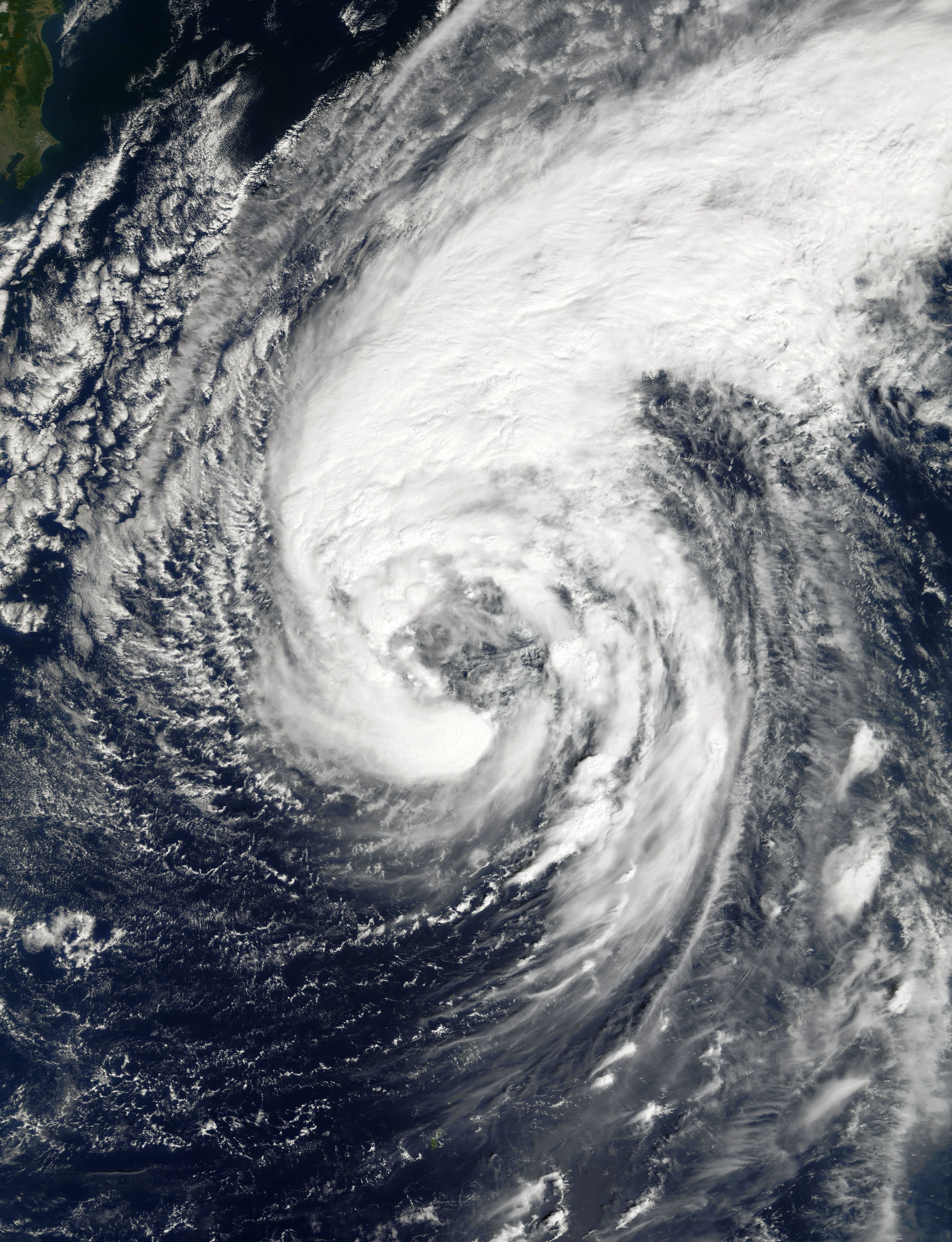
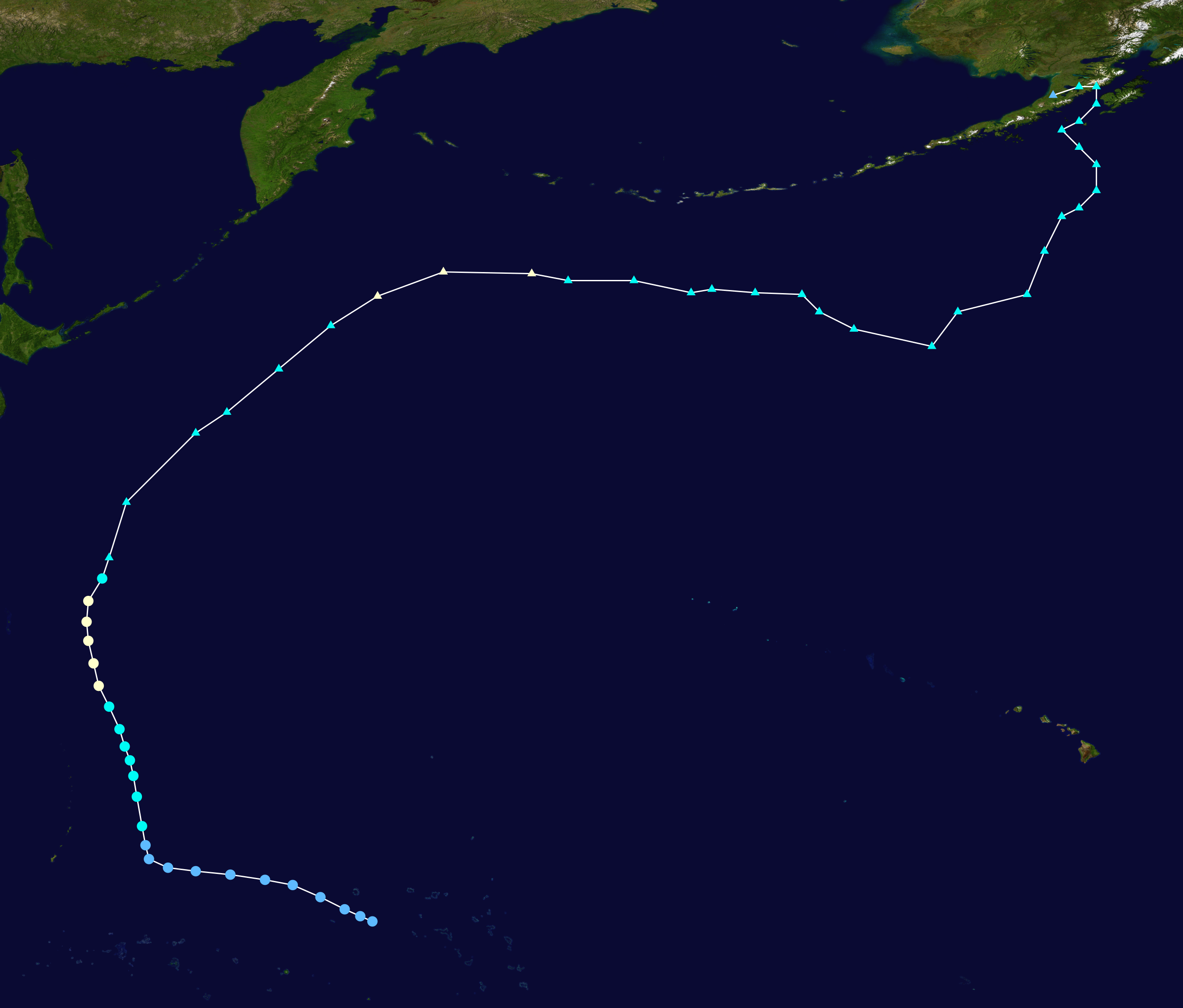
- Duration: October 8 – October 13
- Peak intensity: 100 km/h (65 mph) (10-min); 985 hPa (mbar)

A tropical disturbance organized within the monsoon trough in early October near the FSM. The convection gradually consolidated around a single circulation, developing into a tropical depression on October 8. Wind shear was weak and outflow was good, which allowed for slow strengthening; however, the system was elongated, with a separate circulation to the west. Around this time, the system produced gale-force winds on Kosrae in the FSM. Late on October 9, the JMA upgraded the depression to Tropical Storm Bavi to the east of Guam, although it was still a broad system at the time. After becoming a tropical storm, Bavi moved generally northward due to a ridge retreating to the northeast. By October 11, winds were fairly weak near the center and were stronger in outer rainbands. That day, the JMA estimated peak winds of 100 km/h (62 mph). Despite the broad structure, with an exposed circulation at the peak, the JTWC estimated winds as high as 130 km/h (81 mph), making Bavi a typhoon. Shortly after reaching peak winds, the storm turned to the northeast and entered the westerlies. Increasing shear weakened the convection, and Bavi became extratropical on October 13. It continued to the northeast and crossed into the Central Pacific on October 16.

=== Severe Tropical Storm Maysak ===
- Severe tropical storm (JMA)
- Category 1 typhoon (SSHWS)
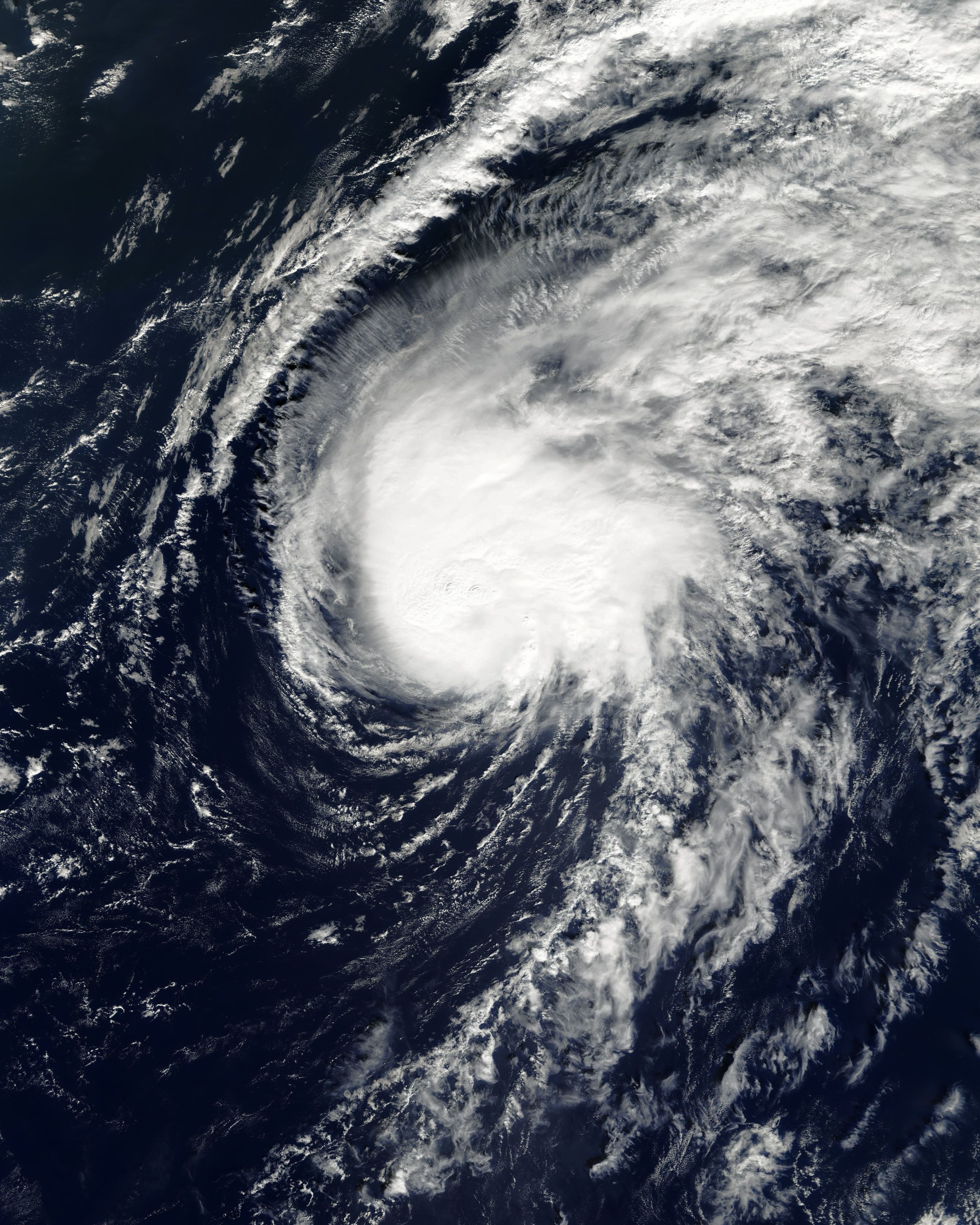
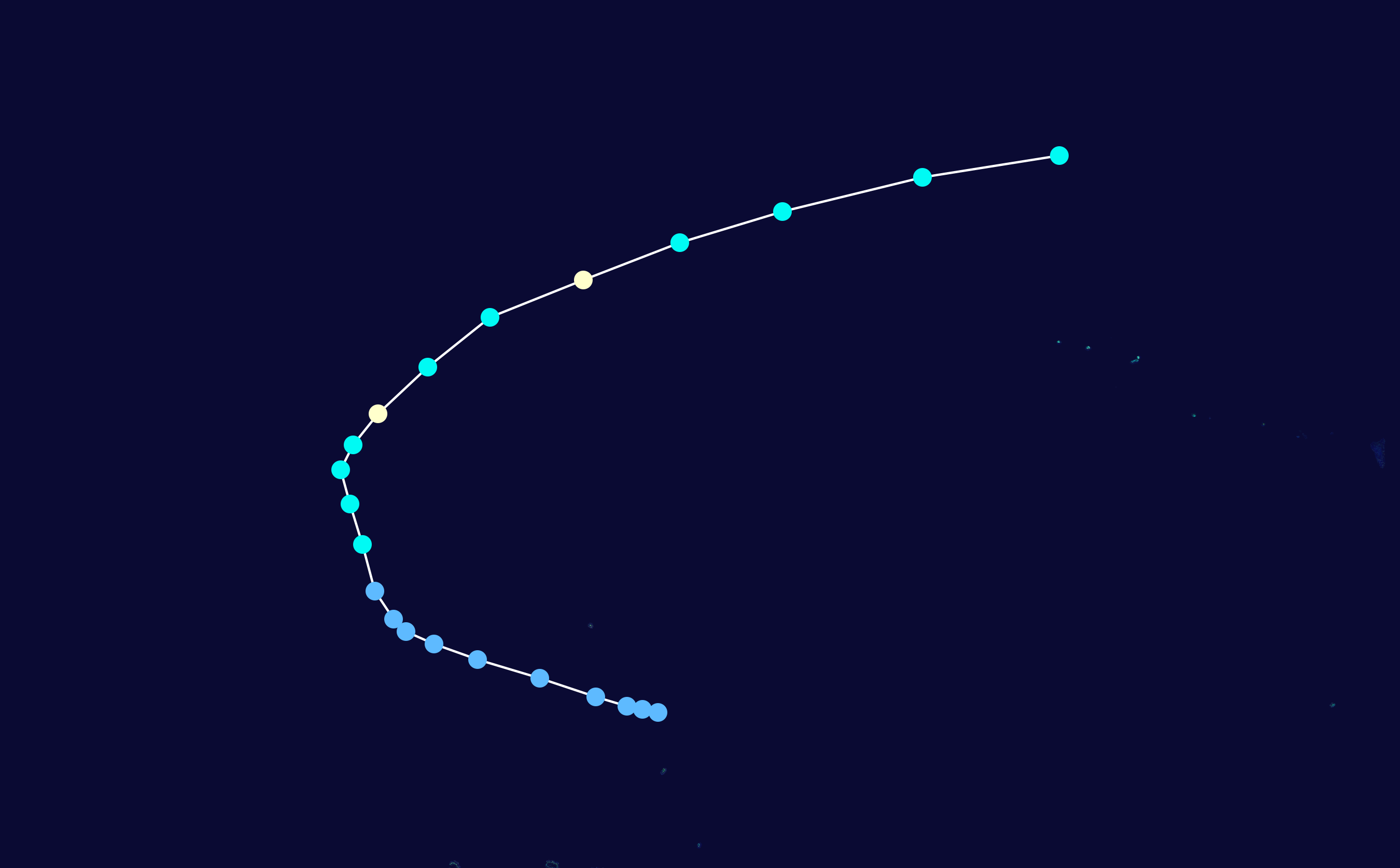
- Duration: October 26 – October 30 (Exited basin)
- Peak intensity: 100 km/h (65 mph) (10-min); 980 hPa (mbar)

On October 25, an organized area of convection persisted southeast of Wake Island. With minimal wind shear, it quickly developed a circulation, becoming a tropical depression on October 26. Due to a ridge to the east, it moved generally northwestward and slowly intensified. Late on October 27, it strengthened into Tropical Storm Maysak. Initially, the system absorbed nearby dry air, although the storm was able to continue developing deep convection. An approaching trough turned Maysak to the northeast, and on October 29 it reached peak winds of 100 km/h (62 mph), according to the JMA. On two occasions, the JTWC assessed Maysak as briefly intensifying into a typhoon, based on an eye feature, although increased shear later caused weakening. Continuing to the northeast, Maysak moved into the central Pacific Ocean on October 30, by which time it had become extratropical.

=== Typhoon Huko ===
- Typhoon (JMA)
- Category 1 typhoon (SSHWS)
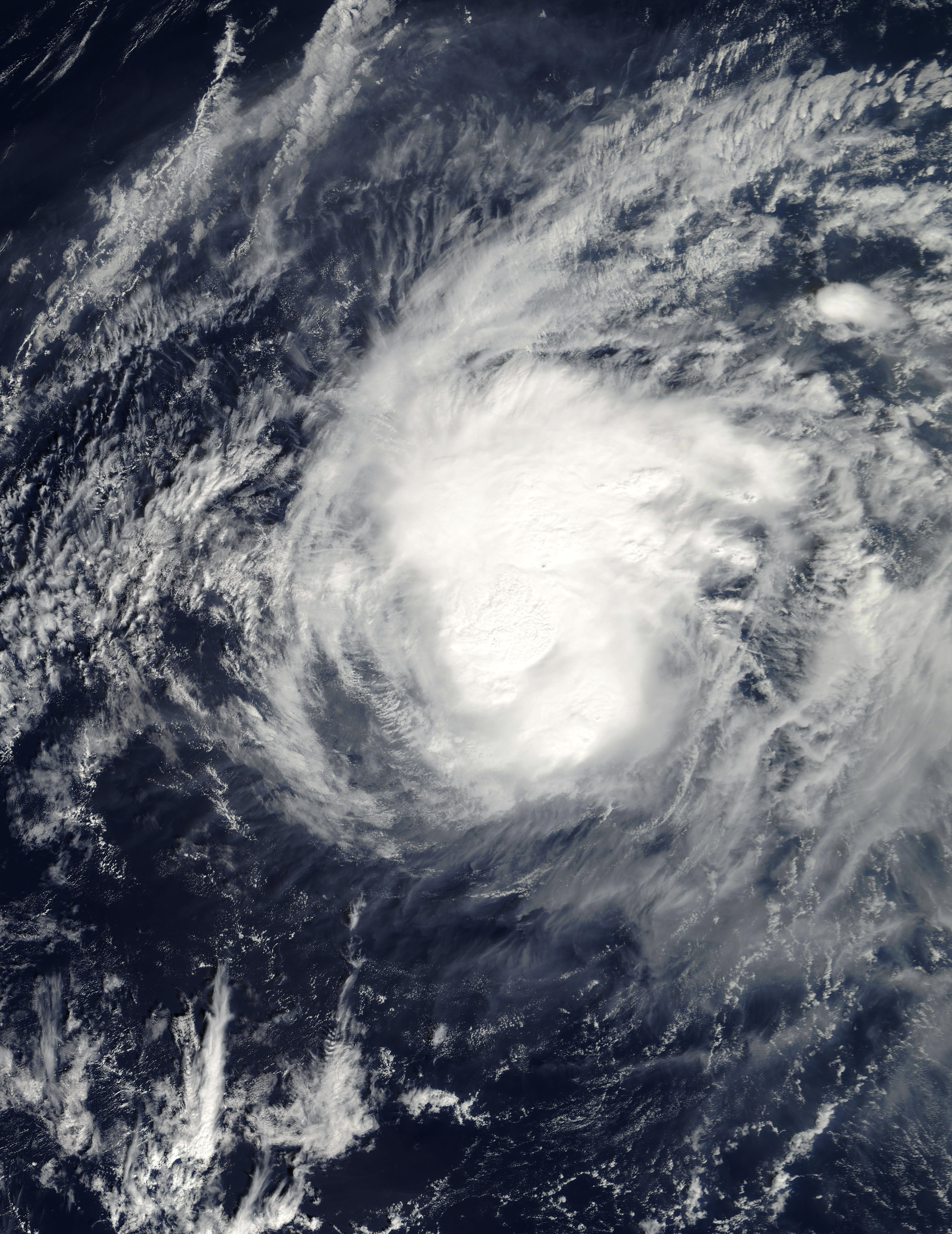
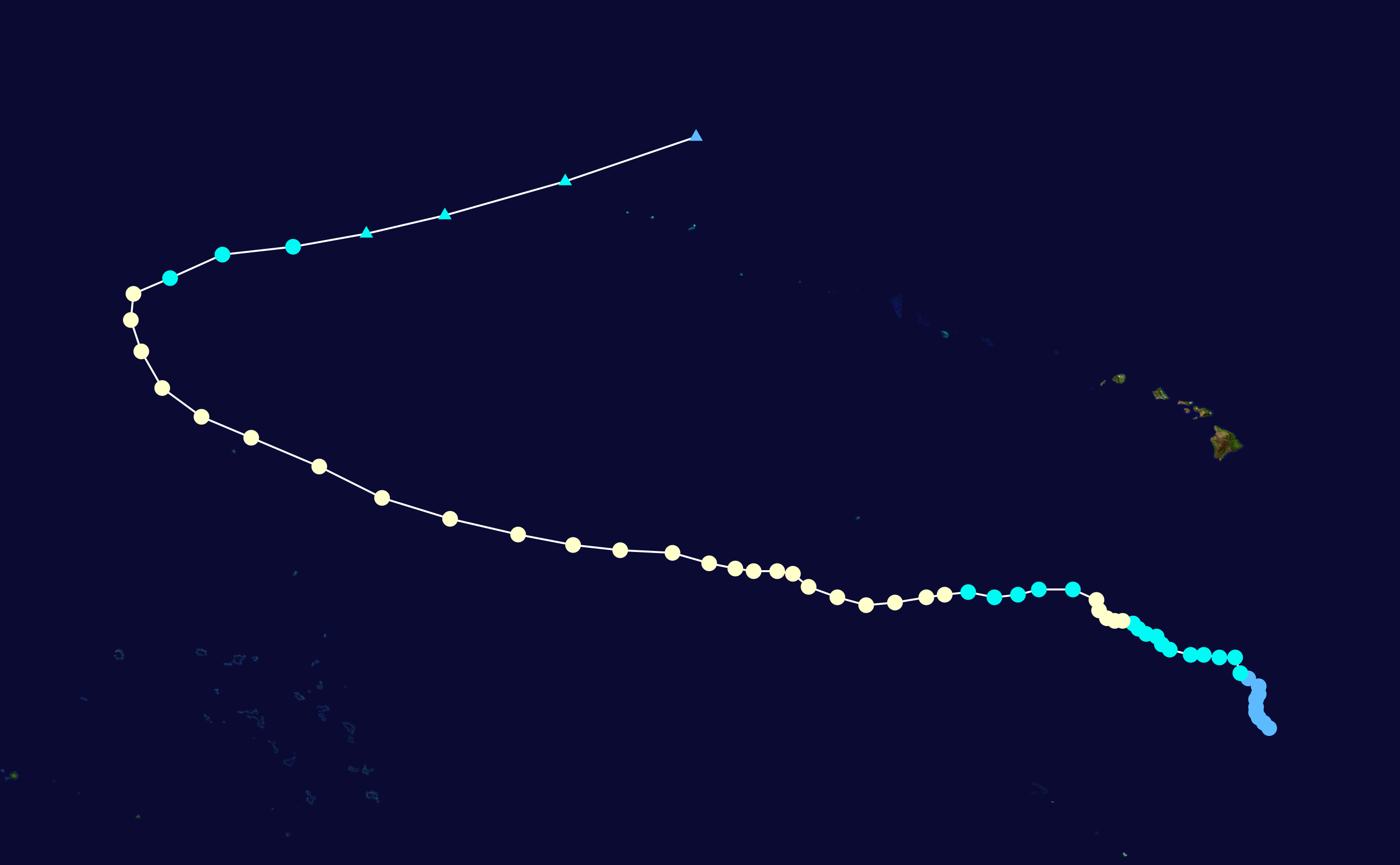
- Duration: November 3 (Entered basin) – November 7
- Peak intensity: 140 km/h (85 mph) (10-min); 985 hPa (mbar)

In the central Pacific Ocean, a tropical depression developed in the monsoon trough on October 24 to the south of Hawaii. It moved generally west-northwestward, intensifying into Tropical Storm Huko on October 26. It became a hurricane two days later, and briefly weakened back to tropical storm status before becoming a hurricane again on October 31. On November 3, Huko crossed the International Date Line into the western Pacific. Despite favorable inflow patterns and warm sea surface temperatures, Huko only strengthened to reach peak winds of 140 km/h (87 mph). It moved quickly to the west-northwest due to a strong ridge to its north. Dry air caused Huko to weaken slightly, and on November 4 the typhoon passed about 95 km (59 mi) northeast of Wake Island. The typhoon brought heavy rains and winds gusts of 40–45 mph (64–72 km/h) to the island. Huko moved through a weakness in the ridge, resulting in a turn to the north and northeast. Late on November 5, Huko weakened below typhoon status, and increasing shear caused further weakening. On November 7, Huko became extratropical, and later that day its remnants crossed back into the central Pacific. Several days later, the remnants affected northern California.

=== Typhoon Haishen ===
- Very strong typhoon (JMA)
- Category 2 typhoon (SSHWS)
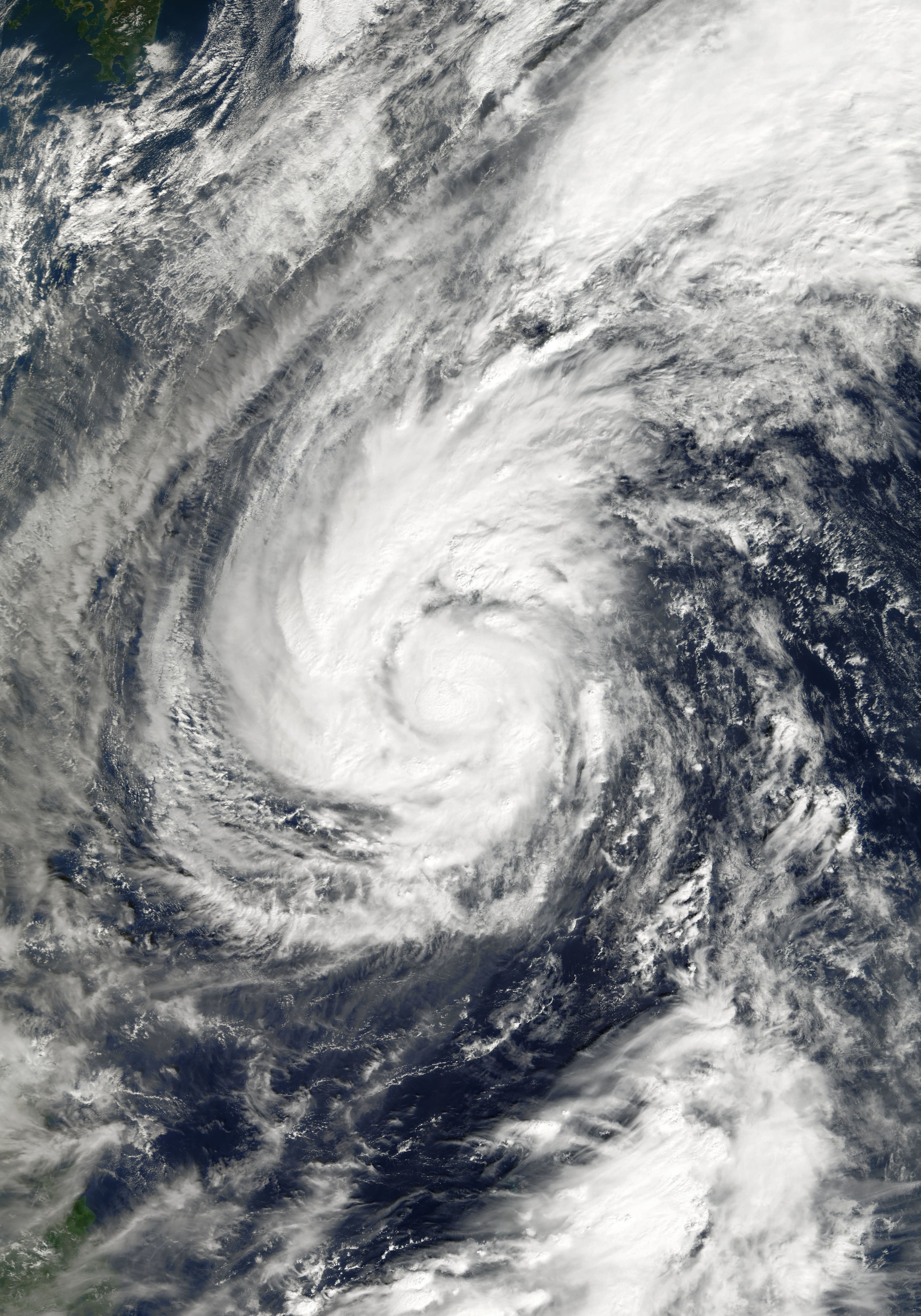
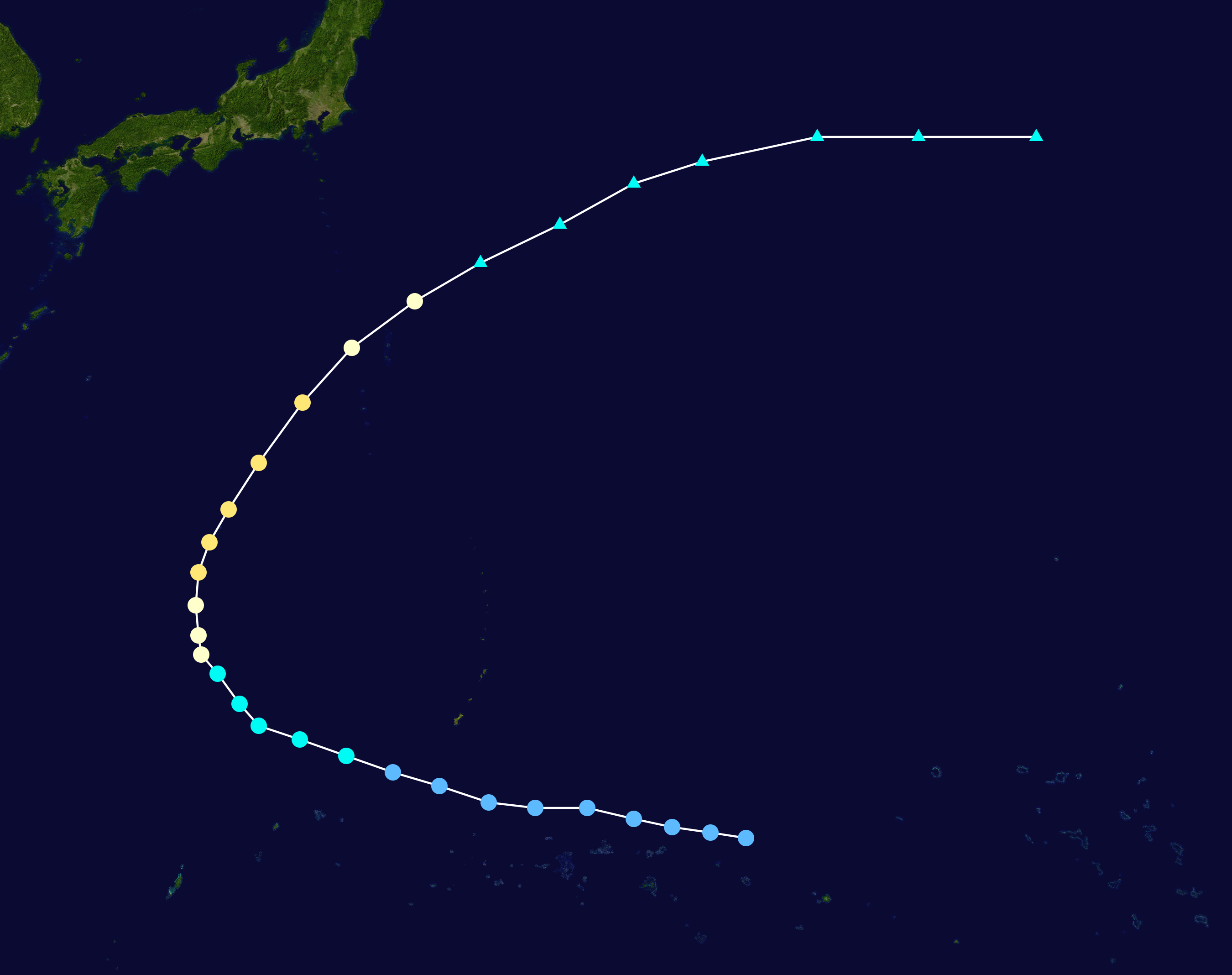
- Duration: November 20 – November 25
- Peak intensity: 155 km/h (100 mph) (10-min); 955 hPa (mbar)

In the middle of November, an area of thunderstorms developed southwest of Chuuk in the FSM within the monsoon trough. With weak shear and good outflow, it slowly organized, becoming a tropical depression on November 20. It moved quickly to the west-northwest, intensifying into Tropical Storm Haishen late on November 20 to the southeast of Guam. While passing south of the island, Haishen produced gale-force winds. The convection organized into a central dense overcast and developed an eye feature. Early on November 23, Haishen intensified into a typhoon; around that time, it began moving to the north due to an approaching trough. The typhoon quickly intensified to peak winds of 155 km/h (96 mph). Soon after, Haishen began weakening due to increasing shear, and the eye quickly dissipated. Late on November 24, it weakened below typhoon status, and early on November 25 Haishen became extratropical. The remnants continued to the northeast, dissipating on November 26.

=== Typhoon Pongsona ===
- Very strong typhoon (JMA)
- Category 4 super typhoon (SSHWS)
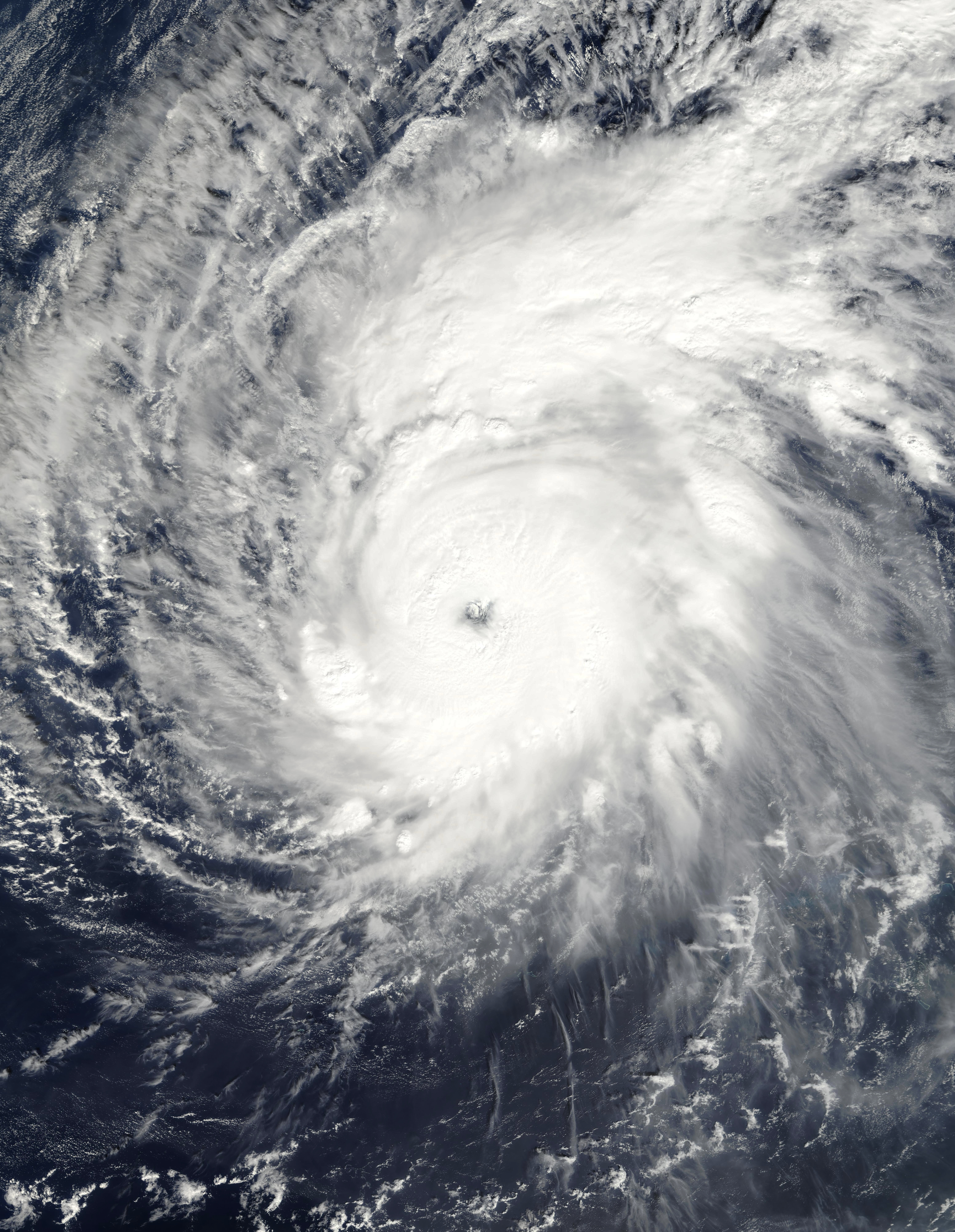
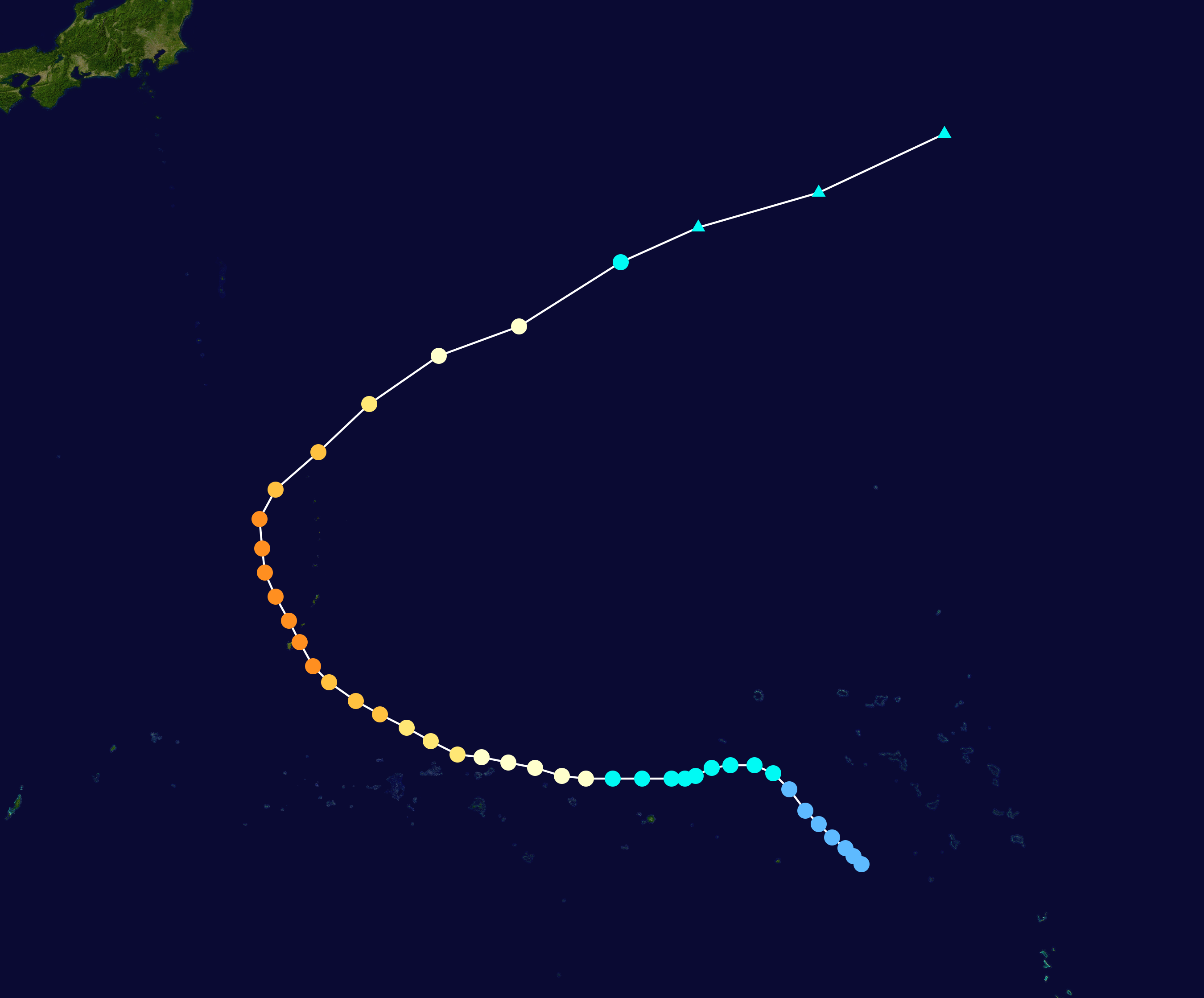
- Duration: December 2 – December 11
- Peak intensity: 165 km/h (105 mph) (10-min); 940 hPa (mbar)

Typhoon Pongsona was the last typhoon of the season, and was the second costliest disaster in 2002 in the United States and its territories. It formed on December 2, having originated as an area of convection to the east-southeast of Pohnpei in late November. With a ridge to the north, the depression tracked generally westward for several days, intensifying into Tropical Storm Pongsona on December 3. After an eye developed on December 5, the storm attained typhoon status to the north of Chuuk. Steady intensification continued, until it became more rapid on December 8 while approaching Guam. That day, the JMA estimated peak winds of 165 km/h (103 mph), and the JTWC estimated peak winds of 240 km/h (150 mph), making Pongsona a super typhoon. Around its peak intensity, the eye of the typhoon moved over Guam and Rota. After striking Guam, Pongsona began moving to the north and later to the northeast, quickly weakening due to the presence of dry air and interaction with an approaching mid-latitude storm. After the convection diminished over the center, Pongsona became extratropical early on December 11. Early the next day, it dissipated in Japan. The remnants of Typhoon Pongsona brought heavy rain and wind to Pacific Northwest and California, as the Pineapple Express storms.

On Guam, Pongsona was the third most intense typhoon on record to strike the island, with wind gusts reaching 278 km/h (173 mph). Damage totaled $700 million, making it one of the five costliest storms on Guam. The typhoon injured 193 people and killed one person. In addition to its strong winds, Pongsona dropped torrential rainfall that peaked at 650.5 mm (25.61 in). A total of 1,751 houses were destroyed on Guam, and another 6,740 were damaged to some degree. Widespread areas lost water, and the road system was heavily damaged. On neighboring Rota, Pongsona damaged 460 houses and destroyed 114, causing an additional $30 million in damage. Both Guam and the Northern Marianas Islands were declared federal disaster areas, which made federal funding available for repairing storm damage. In Guam, the federal government provided about $125 million in funding for individuals and other programs.

=== Other systems ===
- On February 15, a weak tropical depression developed east of Mindanao, according to the JMA; by the next day, the system dissipated.
- On March 15, the JTWC began monitoring a tropical disturbance and upgraded it to a tropical depression on March 19, when it was near Palau. Both the JMA and PAGASA classified the system as a depression on the following day, with the latter naming it Caloy. Moving west-northwestward due to a ridge to the north, the depression moved across Mindanao on March 21 and continued crossing through the archipelago. Due to strong wind shear, the system never intensified further, and as 03W approached the South China Sea, the JMA discontinued advisories on March 23, although the JTWC maintained its status until March 25, when a mid-latitude trough absorbed the system off the east coast of Vietnam. Heavy rains from the depression affected southern Philippines, causing flash flooding and landslides. The storm damaged 2,703 homes, of which 215 were destroyed. Total damage was estimated at $2.4 million (₱124 million). There were 35 deaths in the Philippines, mostly in Surigao del Sur in Mindanao, primarily owing to drownings.
- In early April, a tropical disturbance developed along the southern end of a stationary cold front west of Enewetak Atoll. While gradually organizing, the system produced gale-force wind gusts in Micronesia. On April 5, the JTWC initiated advisories on the disturbance after upgrading it to a tropical depression and designating it as 04W. The depression moved northwestward under the influence of a nearby extratropical cyclone, and it later also became extratropical approximately 650 km (400 mi) west-southwest of Wake Island. The JMA issued its final advisory on April 8.
- A tropical depression formed in the South China Sea on May 28, given the name "Dagul" by PAGASA. The JTWC never anticipated significant strengthening, and the system largely consisted of convection displaced to the southeast of a broad circulation. A ridge to the southeast steered the depression to the northeast, and on May 30 the depression made landfall in southwestern Taiwan. The combination of land interaction and wind shear caused dissipation that day.
- On July 16, an area of convection increased northwest of Palau with a weak circulation. Moderate shear dispersed the thunderstorms, although the system gradually organized. It tracked northwestward due to a ridge to the north, becoming a tropical depression on July 18, when PAGASA gave the name "Juan", and the JTWC classified it as "13W", although the JMA did not classify it as a tropical storm. Early on July 19, Juan struck Samar Island in the Philippines, and continued northwestward through the archipelago. An increase in convection the next day prompted the JTWC to upgrade the system to a tropical storm before it moved over Luzon and the Metro Manila area. Increasing shear and disrupted outflow due to land interaction weakened the system, and the JTWC discontinued advisories on July 22. PAGASA continued tracking the system until the following day. Juan dropped heavy rainfall in the Philippines during its passage, only weeks after several consecutive tropical systems caused deadly flooding in the country. The rains forced 2,400 people to evacuate. Storm-related tornadoes and landslides killed at least three people. Three people were electrocuted, and flash flooding killed at least two people. In all, 13W (known as Juan), killed 14 people and injured two others. There were 583 houses that were damaged or destroyed, and damage totaled about $240,000 (₱12.1 million PHP), mostly on Luzon.
- The JMA monitored a tropical depression east of Iwo Jima on July 25, although by the next day the agency was no longer tracking the system. Another tropical depression formed on September 21 to the northeast of the Marshall Islands, but dissipated by the next day.
- On August 3, a small circulation was located just off the southeast coast of Japan, which later developed an area of convection over it. The JTWC initiated advisories on Tropical Depression 17W at 06:00 UTC on August 5, describing the system as a "midget cyclone". A mid-level ridge to the southeast steered the depression eastward away from Japan. Unfavorable conditions caused weakening, and the JTWC discontinued advisories six hours after its first warning.
- A tropical depression developed on August 10 east of the Philippines. Initially it was disorganized due to hostile conditions, and it failed to intensify significantly before crossing the Philippine island of Luzon. There, flooding forced 3,500 people to evacuate their homes. In the Philippines, the storm killed 35 people and caused $3.3 million in damage, with 13,178 houses damaged or destroyed. It was the final storm named by PAGASA during the season. After affecting the Philippines, the tropical depression moved into the South China Sea and dissipated on August 14. During the next day, despite separate systems, the remnants of 18W formed another system which would later intensify into Tropical Storm Vongfong.
- A tropical depression was classified by the JMA on October 12 in the South China Sea. It quickly dissipated, although the system dropped heavy rainfall reaching 108 mm (4.3 in) at a station in the Paracel Islands.
- Tropical Depression 27W formed on October 17 about 1,220 km (760 mi) east-northeast of Saipan. It moved westward due to a ridge to the north, and failed to intensify due to weak outflow and dry air. It dissipated on October 19.
- On October 18, another depression formed near the International Date Line. Classified as Tropical Depression 28W by the JTWC, it moved generally northward due to a break in the ridge. Wind shear dissipated the depression on October 20.

== Storm names ==
Within the western Pacific Ocean, both the JMA and PAGASA assign names to tropical cyclones that develop in the basin, which can result in a tropical cyclone having two names. As part of its duty as a Regional Specialized Meteorological Center (RSMC), the JMA's Typhoon Center in Tokyo assigns international names to tropical cyclones on behalf of the World Meteorological Organization's Typhoon Committee, should they be judged to have 10-minute sustained winds of 65 km/h (40 mph). The PAGASA assigns names to all tropical cyclones that move into or form as a tropical depression in their area of responsibility, located between 135°E and 115°E and between 5°N-25°N, even if the cyclone has had an international name assigned to it. The names of significant tropical cyclones are retired, by both PAGASA and the Typhoon Committee. PAGASA also has an auxiliary naming list, of which the first ten are published, should their list of names be exhausted.

=== International names ===
During the season 26 named tropical cyclones developed in the Western Pacific and were named by the Japan Meteorological Agency, when it was determined that they had become tropical storms. These names were contributed to a list of a 140 names submitted by the fourteen members nations and territories of the ESCAP/WMO Typhoon Committee. All of the names on the list were used for the first (and only, in the cases of Noguri, Chataan, Changmi, Rusa and Pongsona) time. Noguri and Changmi had their spellings corrected to Neoguri and Jangmi, while the other three names were retired.

Tapah	Mitag	Hagibis	Noguri	Rammasun	Chataan	Halong	Nakri	Fengshen	Kalmaegi	Fung-wong	Kammuri
Phanfone	Vongfong	Rusa	Sinlaku	Hagupit	Changmi	Mekkhala	Higos	Bavi	Maysak	Haishen	Pongsona

=== Other names ===
If a tropical cyclone enters the Western Pacific basin from the Eastern and Central Pacific basin (west of 180°E), it will retain the name assigned to it by the National Hurricane Center (NHC) and Central Pacific Hurricane Center (CPHC). The following storms were named in this manner.

- Ele
- Huko

=== Philippines ===
Agaton	Basyang	Caloy	Dagul	Espada
Florita	Gloria	Hambalos	Inday	Juan
Kaka	Lagalag	Milenyo	Neneng (unused)	Ompong (unused)
Paloma (unused)	Quadro (unused)	Rapido (unused)	Sibasib (unused)	Tagbanwa (unused)
Usman (unused)	Venus (unused)	Wisik (unused)	Yayang (unused)	Zeny (unused)
Auxiliary list
Agila (unused)	Bagwis (unused)	Ciriaco (unused)	Diego (unused)	Elena (unused)
Forte (unused)	Gunding (unused)	Hunyango (unused)	Itoy (unused)	Jessa (unused)

The Philippine Atmospheric, Geophysical and Astronomical Services Administration uses its own naming scheme for tropical cyclones in their area of responsibility. PAGASA assigns names to tropical depressions that form within their area of responsibility and any tropical cyclone that might move into their area of responsibility, and the lists are reused every four years. Should the list of names for a given year prove to be insufficient, names are taken from an auxiliary list, the first 10 of which are published each year before the season starts.

As this was the second set of a new set of names that was established by PAGASA in 2001, each of the names used in this list was utilized for the first time (and only, in the cases of Dagul, Espada, Gloria, Hambalos, Kaka, and Lagalag). The names Neneng and Yayang were taken from the old list. Names that were not assigned are marked in gray.

=== Retirement ===
The names Chataan, Rusa, and Pongsona were retired by the ESCAP/WMO Typhoon Committee. The names Matmo, Nuri, and Noul were chosen to replace Chataan, Rusa and Pongsona respectively.

== Season effects ==
The following table does not include unnamed storms, and PAGASA names are in parentheses. Storms entering from the Central Pacific only include their information while in the western Pacific, and are noted with an asterisk *.

Name	Dates	Peak intensity			Areas affected	Damage (USD)	Deaths	Ref(s).
Name	Dates	Category	Wind speed	Pressure	Areas affected	Damage (USD)	Deaths	Ref(s).
Tapah (Agaton)	January 10–13	Tropical storm	75 km/h (47 mph)	996 hPa (29.41 inHg)	Philippines	None	None	
TD	February 15	Tropical Depression	55 km/h (34 mph)	1,006 hPa (29.71 inHg)	None	None	None	
Mitag (Basyang)	February 27 – March 9	Very strong typhoon	175 km/h (109 mph)	930 hPa (27.46 inHg)	Federated States of Micronesia, Palau	$150 million	2	
03W (Caloy)	March 21–23	Tropical Depression	55 km/h (34 mph)	1,004 hPa (29.65 inHg)	Philippines	$2.4 million	35	
04W	April 6–8	Tropical Depression	55 km/h (34 mph)	1,004 hPa (29.65 inHg)	None	None	None	
Hagibis	May 15–21	Very strong typhoon	175 km/h (109 mph)	935 hPa (27.61 inHg)	Caroline Islands, Mariana Islands	None	None	
06W (Dagul)	May 26–30	Tropical Depression	55 km/h (34 mph)	1,002 hPa (29.59 inHg)	Philippines, Taiwan	None	None	
TD	May 27–29	Tropical Depression	Not specified	1,008 hPa (29.77 inHg)	None	None	None	
TD	June 3–5	Tropical Depression	Not specified	1,004 hPa (29.65 inHg)	Ryukyu Islands	None	None	
Noguri (Espada)	June 4–10	Severe tropical storm	110 km/h (68 mph)	975 hPa (28.79 inHg)	Japan, Taiwan	$4 million	None	
Rammasun (Florita)	June 28 – July 6	Very strong typhoon	155 km/h (96 mph)	945 hPa (27.91 inHg)	China, Korean Peninsula, Ryukyu Islands, Taiwan	$100 million	97	
Chataan (Gloria)	June 28 – July 11	Very strong typhoon	175 km/h (109 mph)	930 hPa (27.46 inHg)	Chuuk, Guam, Japan	$660 million	54	
Halong (Inday)	July 6 – July 16	Very strong typhoon	155 km/h (96 mph)	945 hPa (27.91 inHg)	Guam, Philippines, Japan	$89.8 million	10	
Nakri (Hambalos)	July 7–13	Severe tropical storm	95 km/h (59 mph)	983 hPa (29.03 inHg)	Philippines, China, Taiwan, Japan	None	2	
Fengshen	July 13–28	Very strong typhoon	185 km/h (115 mph)	920 hPa (27.17 inHg)	Japan, China	$4 million	5	
13W (Juan)	July 18–23	Tropical depression	55 km/h (34 mph)	1,002 hPa (29.59 inHg)	Philippines	$240,000	14	
Fung-wong (Kaka)	July 18–27	Strong typhoon	130 km/h (81 mph)	960 hPa (28.35 inHg)	Japan	None	None	
Kalmaegi	July 20–21	Tropical storm	65 km/h (40 mph)	1,003 hPa (29.62 inHg)	None	None	None	
TD	July 25–26	Tropical Depression	Not specified	1,004 hPa (29.65 inHg)	None	None	None	
TD	July 29–30	Tropical Depression	Not specified	998 hPa (29.47 inHg)	South China	None	None	
Kammuri (Lagalag)	August 2–7	Severe tropical storm	100 km/h (62 mph)	980 hPa (28.94 inHg)	China	$509 million	153	
17W	August 5–6	Tropical depression	55 km/h (34 mph)	999 hPa (29.50 inHg)	None	None	None	
18W (Milenyo)	August 11–14	Tropical depression	55 km/h (34 mph)	998 hPa (29.47 inHg)	Philippines	$3.3 million	35	
Phanfone	August 11–20	Very strong typhoon	155 km/h (96 mph)	940 hPa (27.76 inHg)	Japan	None	None	
Vongfong	August 15–20	Tropical storm	75 km/h (47 mph)	985 hPa (29.09 inHg)	China	$86 million	9	
Rusa	August 22 – September 1	Strong typhoon	150 km/h (93 mph)	950 hPa (28.05 inHg)	Japan, South Korea, North Korea	$4.2 billion	238	
Sinlaku	August 27 – September 9	Strong typhoon	150 km/h (93 mph)	950 hPa (28.05 inHg)	Japan, China	$723 million	30	
Ele	August 30 – September 10	Very strong typhoon	165 km/h (103 mph)	940 hPa (27.76 inHg)	None	None	None	
Hagupit	September 9–15	Tropical storm	85 km/h (53 mph)	990 hPa (29.23 inHg)	China	$32.5 million	25	
TD	September 18–19	Tropical Depression	Not specified	1,002 hPa (29.59 inHg)	Mariana Islands	None	None	
Changmi	September 20–22	Tropical storm	85 km/h (53 mph)	985 hPa (29.09 inHg)	None	None	None	
TD	September 21–22	Tropical Depression	Not specified	1,008 hPa (29.77 inHg)	None	None	None	
Mekkhala	September 22–28	Tropical storm	85 km/h (53 mph)	990 hPa (29.23 inHg)	China	$103 million	None	
Higos	September 26 – October 2	Very strong typhoon	175 km/h (109 mph)	930 hPa (27.46 inHg)	Japan, Primorsky Krai	$2.14 billion	12	
Bavi	October 8–13	Severe tropical storm	100 km/h (62 mph)	985 hPa (29.09 inHg)	None	None	None	
TD	October 12	Tropical Depression	Not specified	1,004 hPa (29.65 inHg)	None	None	None	
27W	October 15–18	Tropical depression	55 km/h (34 mph)	1,004 hPa (29.65 inHg)	None	None	None	
28W	October 18–19	Tropical depression	55 km/h (34 mph)	1,008 hPa (29.77 inHg)	None	None	None	
TD	October 23–24	Tropical Depression	Not specified	1,010 hPa (29.83 inHg)	Taiwan	None	None	
Maysak	October 26–30	Severe tropical storm	100 km/h (62 mph)	980 hPa (28.94 inHg)	None	None	None	
Huko	November 3–7	Strong typhoon	140 km/h (87 mph)	985 hPa (29.09 inHg)	None	None	None	
Haishen	November 20–24	Very strong typhoon	155 km/h (96 mph)	955 hPa (28.20 inHg)	None	None	None	
TD	November 27	Tropical Depression	Not specified	1,008 hPa (29.77 inHg)	None	None	None	
Pongsona	December 2–11	Very strong typhoon	165 km/h (103 mph)	940 hPa (27.76 inHg)	Guam, Northern Marianas Islands	$730 million	1	
Season aggregates
44 systems	January 10 – December 11, 2002		185 km/h (115 mph)	920 hPa (27.17 inHg)		>9.54 billion	725	

== See also ==
- Tropical cyclones in 2002
- List of Pacific typhoon seasons
- 2002 Pacific hurricane season
- 2002 Atlantic hurricane season
- 2002 North Indian Ocean cyclone season
- South-West Indian Ocean cyclone seasons: 2001–02, 2002–03
- Australian region cyclone seasons: 2001–02, 2002–03
- South Pacific cyclone seasons: 2001–02, 2002–03
