= Timeline of the 2002 Pacific hurricane season =

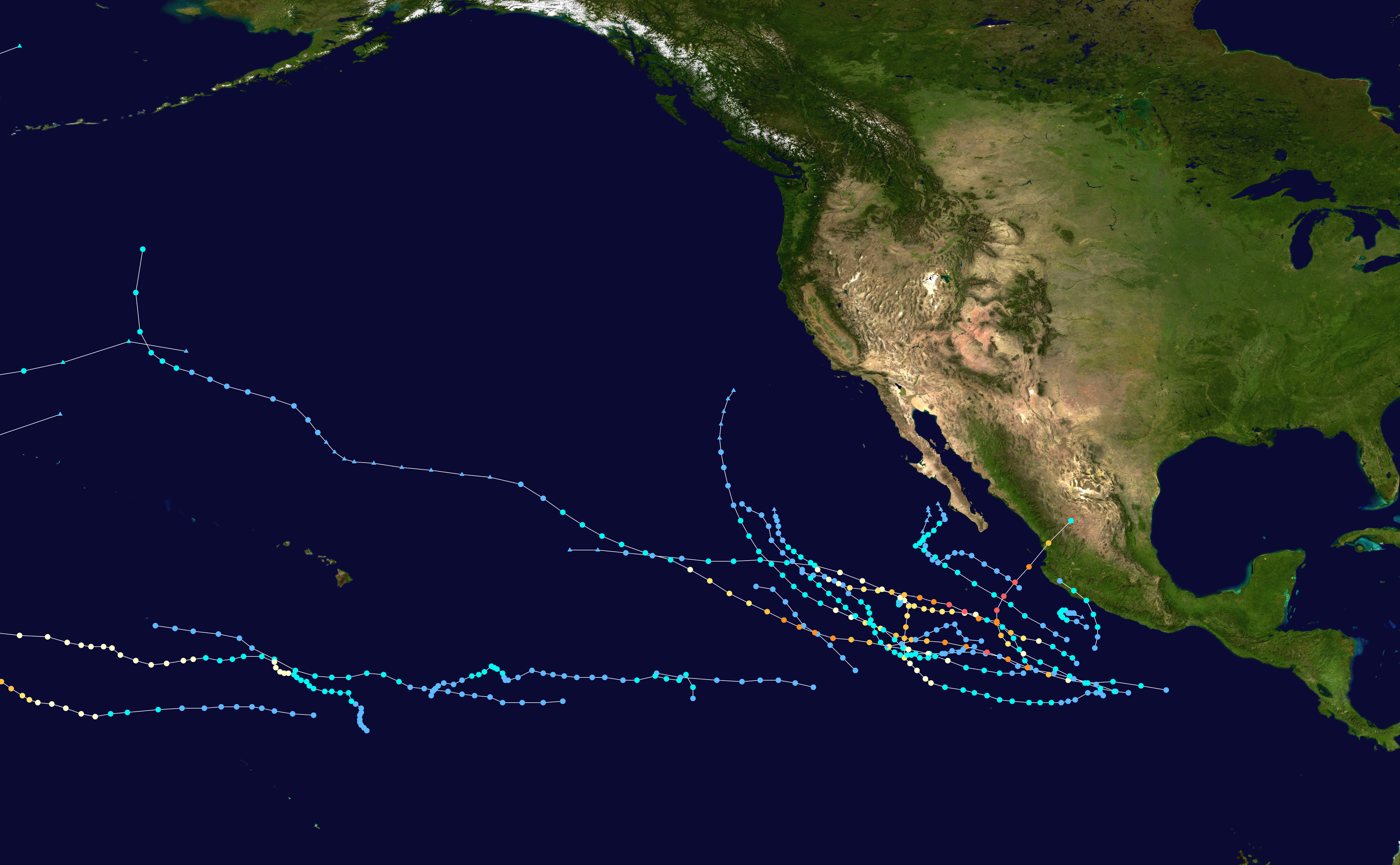
- Season summary map

Season boundaries
- First system formed: May 24, 2002
- Last system dissipated: November 16, 2002

Strongest system
- Name: Kenna
- Maximum winds: 270 km/h (165 mph) (1-minute sustained)
- Lowest pressure: 913 hPa (mbar)

Longest lasting system
- Name: Fausto
- Duration: 11.50 days
Storm articles
- Hurricane Kenna

The 2002 Pacific hurricane season consisted of the events that occurred in the annual cycle of tropical cyclone formation over the Pacific Ocean north of the equator and east of the International Date Line. The official bounds of each Pacific hurricane season are dates that conventionally delineate the period each year during which tropical cyclones tend to form in the basin according to the National Hurricane Center (NHC), beginning on May 15 in the Eastern Pacific proper (east of 140°W) and June 1 in the Central Pacific (140°W to the International Date Line), and ending on November 30 in both areas. However, tropical cyclogenesis is possible at any time of year. The first tropical cyclone of the season, Hurricane Alma, developed on May 24; the final system, Tropical Depression Sixteen-E, dissipated on November 16.

Nineteen tropical depressions developed during the 2002 season, with fifteen further strengthening into named tropical storms; (Note: These totals exclude one tropical depression and one tropical storm that were tracked by the Japan Meteorological Agency (JMA) and/or the Joint Typhoon Warning Center (JTWC), but were not recognized as tropical cyclones by the National Hurricane Center (NHC) nor the Central Pacific Hurricane Center (CPHC), and therefore are not officially counted towards the 2002 Pacific hurricane season.) eight became hurricanes, of which six attained major hurricane status. (Note: A major hurricane is a Pacific or Atlantic hurricane that reaches Category 3 or higher on the five-level Saffir–Simpson scale, with maximum sustained winds of at least 111 mph (179 km/h).) Activity was generally near normal, with the number of tropical storms and hurricanes matching the respective 1991–2020 averages; however, the number of major hurricanes was above the average of four for the same period. Hurricanes Elida, Hernan, and Kenna achieved Category 5 strength on the Saffir–Simpson scale, tying a record set in 1994 for the most storms to do so in one season since reliable records began in 1971.

Hurricane Kenna in late October was by far the most impactful storm of the season. After weakening from its peak intensity—which was marked by a minimum barometric pressure of 913 mbar (26.96 inHg), making it the fourth-most intense Pacific hurricane on record—Kenna made landfall on the coast of western Mexico at Category 4 status with maximum sustained winds of 140 mph (220 km/h). These winds, combined with a storm surge of up to 16 feet (4.9 m), devastated the area surrounding the fishing village of San Blas, Nayarit, where as many as 95% of homes were damaged or destroyed; four people were killed. The name Kenna would later be retired on account of the hurricane's effects in Mexico.

Aside from Kenna, effects on land were relatively light during the season. Tropical Storm Julio struck southern Mexico in late September, causing torrential rainfall; flash floods damaged structures, and slick roads contributed to a bus accident that killed three people. Tropical Storms Boris and Iselle generated heavy rainfall in Mexico without coming ashore, while Tropical Depression Eleven-E prompted the issuance of a tropical storm warning and hurricane watch for portions of the Baja California peninsula but dissipated off the coast without impact. Hurricanes Alma and Fausto were noted for unusual meteorological feats, though neither storm affected land; Alma followed 2001's Hurricane Adolph as only the second known Pacific major hurricane in the month of May, while Fausto regenerated into a tropical storm far to the north of the Hawaiian Islands, where tropical cyclones are rarely observed.

Prior to 2015, two time zones were utilized in the Eastern Pacific basin: Pacific east of 140°W, and Hawaii−Aleutian from 140°W to the International Date Line. For convenience, each event is listed in Coordinated Universal Time (UTC) first, using the 24-hour clock (where 00:00 = midnight UTC), with the respective local time included in parentheses. Figures for maximum sustained winds and position estimates are rounded to the nearest five units (knots, miles, or kilometers) and averaged over one minute, following National Hurricane Center practice. Direct wind observations are rounded to the nearest whole number. Atmospheric pressures are listed to the nearest millibar and nearest hundredth of an inch of mercury. This timeline documents the formation of tropical cyclones as well as the strengthening, weakening, landfalls, extratropical transitions, and dissipations during the season. It also includes information that was not released while the storm was active, meaning that data from post-storm reviews by the National Hurricane Center and the Central Pacific Hurricane Center is included.

== Timeline of events ==
=== May ===
==== May 15 ====
- The 2002 Eastern Pacific hurricane season officially begins.

==== May 24 ====
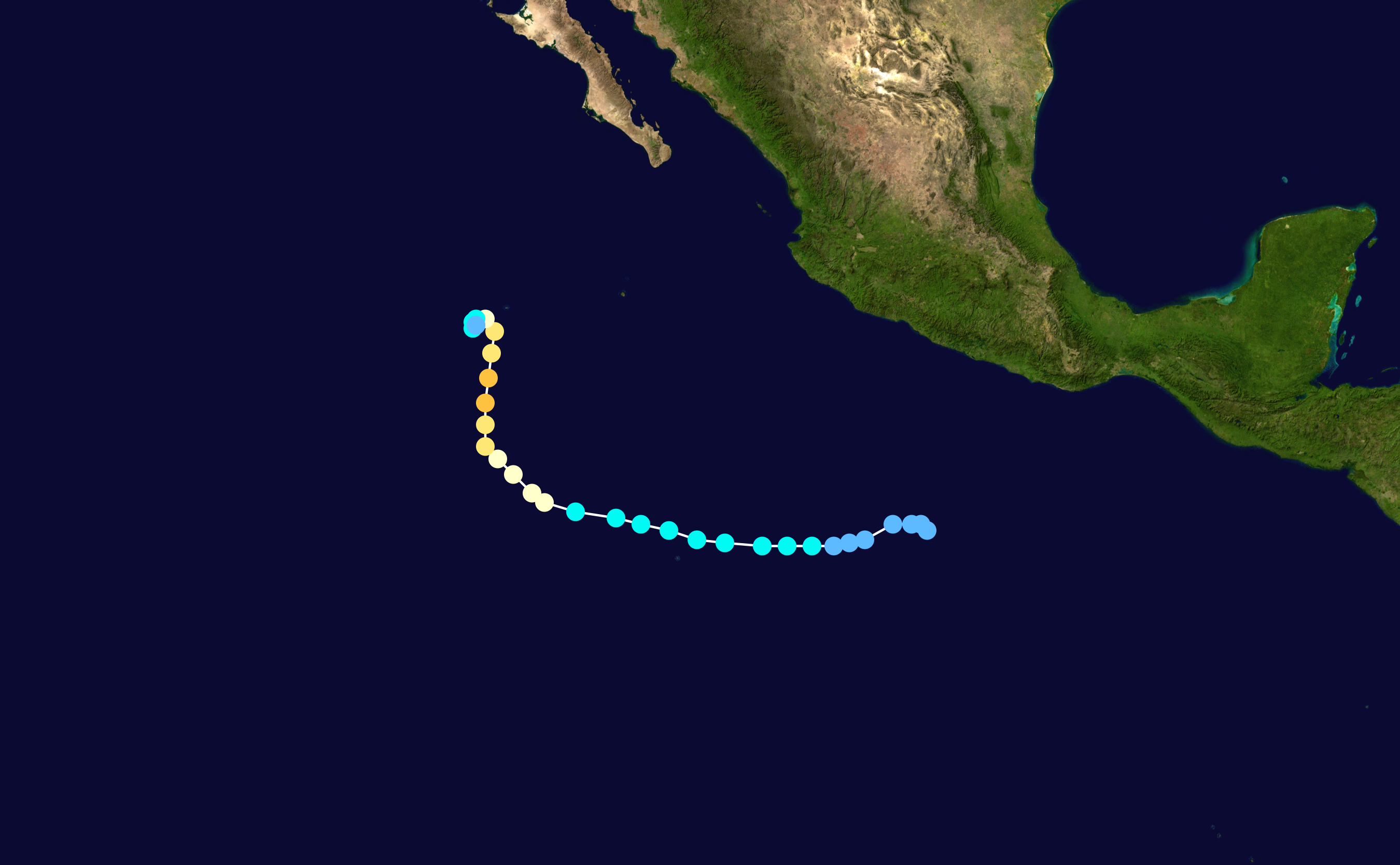
Storm path of Hurricane Alma

- 18:00 UTC (11:00 a.m. PDT) at 11.2°N 101.2°W – Tropical Depression One-E forms from an area of low pressure about 560 mi (900 km) south-southeast of Manzanillo, Colima.

==== May 26 ====
- 12:00 UTC (5:00 a.m. PDT) at 10.7°N 104.9°W – Tropical Depression One-E strengthens into Tropical Storm Alma about 655 mi (1,055 km) south of Manzanillo, Colima.

==== May 28 ====
- 18:00 UTC (11:00 a.m. PDT) at 12.1°N 113.5°W – Tropical Storm Alma strengthens into a Category 1 hurricane about 785 mi (1,260 km) southwest of Manzanillo, Colima.

==== May 29 ====
- 18:00 UTC (11:00 a.m. PDT) at 13.9°N 115.4°W – Hurricane Alma strengthens to Category 2 intensity about 815 mi (1,315 km) west-southwest of Manzanillo, Colima.

==== May 30 ====
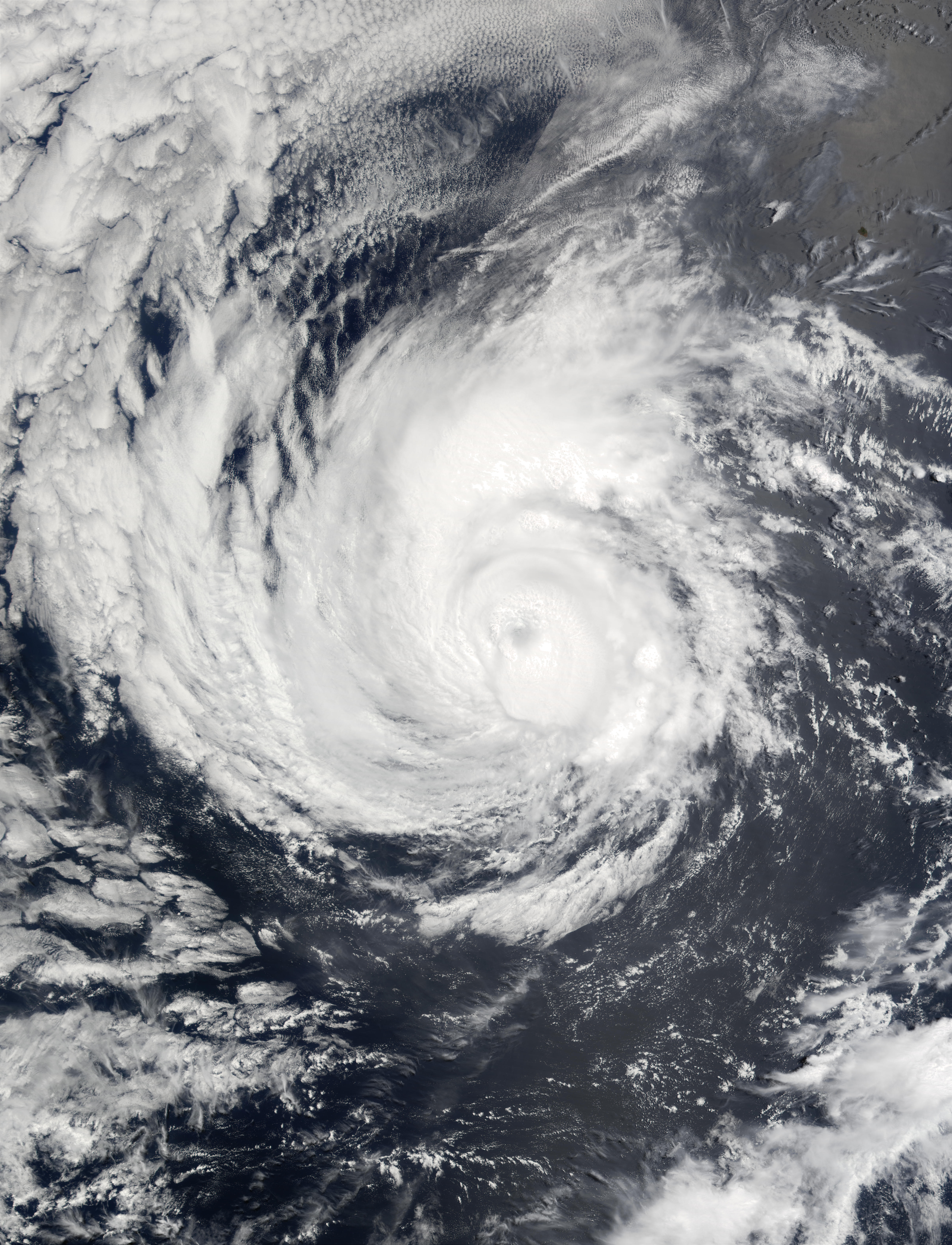
Satellite image of Hurricane Alma gaining strength on May 29

- 06:00 UTC (11:00 p.m. PDT, May 29) at 15.3°N 115.4°W – Hurricane Alma strengthens to Category 3 intensity about 635 mi (1,020 km) southwest of Cabo San Lucas, Baja California Sur, making it the first major hurricane of the season; it simultaneously reaches maximum sustained winds of 115 mph (185 km/h) and a minimum barometric pressure of 960 mbar (28.35 inHg).
- 18:00 UTC (11:00 a.m. PDT) at 16.9°N 115.2°W – Hurricane Alma weakens to Category 2 intensity about 535 mi (860 km) southwest of Cabo San Lucas, Baja California Sur.

==== May 31 ====
- 06:00 UTC (11:00 p.m. PDT, May 30) at 18.0°N 115.4°W – Hurricane Alma weakens to Category 1 intensity about 490 mi (790 km) southwest of Cabo San Lucas, Baja California Sur.
- 12:00 UTC (5:00 a.m. PDT) at 18.0°N 115.7°W – Hurricane Alma weakens into a tropical storm about 500 mi (805 km) southwest of Cabo San Lucas, Baja California Sur.

=== June ===
==== June 1 ====
- The 2002 Central Pacific hurricane season officially begins.
- 06:00 UTC (11:00 p.m. PDT, May 31) at 17.8°N 115.7°W – Tropical Storm Alma weakens into a tropical depression about 510 mi (825 km) southwest of Cabo San Lucas, Baja California Sur.
- 18:00 UTC (11:00 a.m. PDT) at 17.8°N 115.7°W – Tropical Depression Alma degenerates into a remnant low about 510 mi (825 km) southwest of Cabo San Lucas, Baja California Sur.

==== June 8 ====
- 12:00 UTC (5:00 a.m. PDT) at 16.1°N 102.4°W – A tropical depression forms from an area of disturbed weather about 175 mi (280 km) west-southwest of Acapulco, Guerrero.

==== June 9 ====
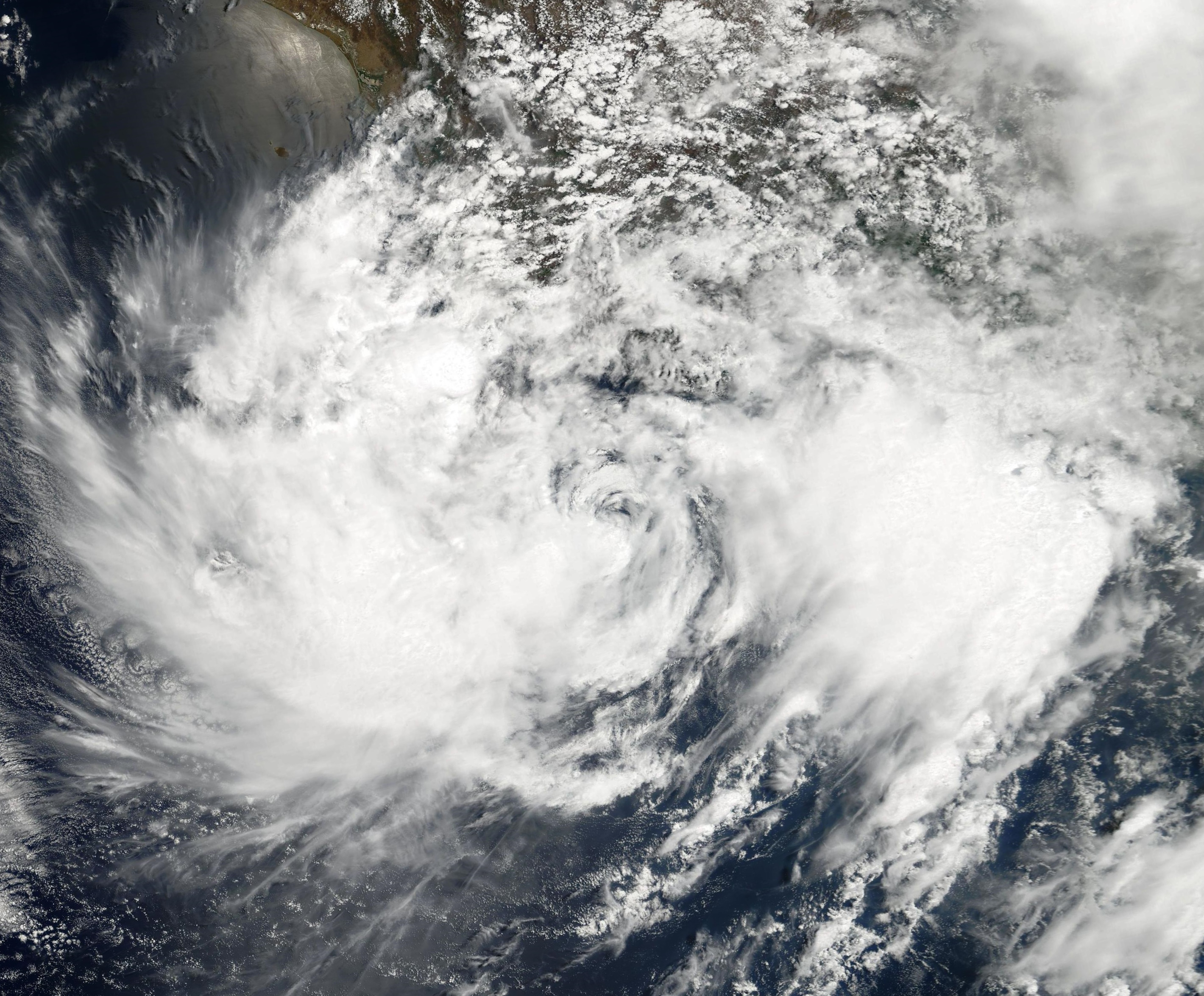
Satellite image of Tropical Storm Boris off the southwest coast of Mexico on June 9

- 00:00 UTC (5:00 p.m. PDT, June 8) at 16.6°N 103.8°W – The tropical depression strengthens into Tropical Storm Boris about 175 mi (280 km) south-southeast of Manzanillo, Colima.
- 06:00 UTC (11:00 p.m. PDT, June 8) at 16.8°N 104.1°W – Tropical Storm Boris reaches maximum sustained winds of 60 mph (95 km/h) and a minimum barometric pressure of 997 mbar (29.44 inHg) about 155 mi (250 km) south of Manzanillo, Colima.

==== June 10 ====
- 18:00 UTC (11:00 a.m. PDT) at 17.1°N 103.7°W – Tropical Storm Boris weakens into a tropical depression about 115 mi (185 km) south-southeast of Manzanillo, Colima.

==== June 11 ====
- 18:00 UTC (11:00 a.m. PDT) at 17.0°N 103.2°W – Tropical Depression Boris degenerates into a remnant low about 160 mi (260 km) south-southeast of Manzanillo, Colima.

==== June 27 ====
- 12:00 UTC (5:00 a.m. PDT) at 11.8°N 121.9°W – Tropical Depression Three-E forms from a tropical wave about 1,115 mi (1,800 km) southwest of the southern tip of the Baja California peninsula; it simultaneously reaches maximum sustained winds of 35 mph (55 km/h).

==== June 28 ====
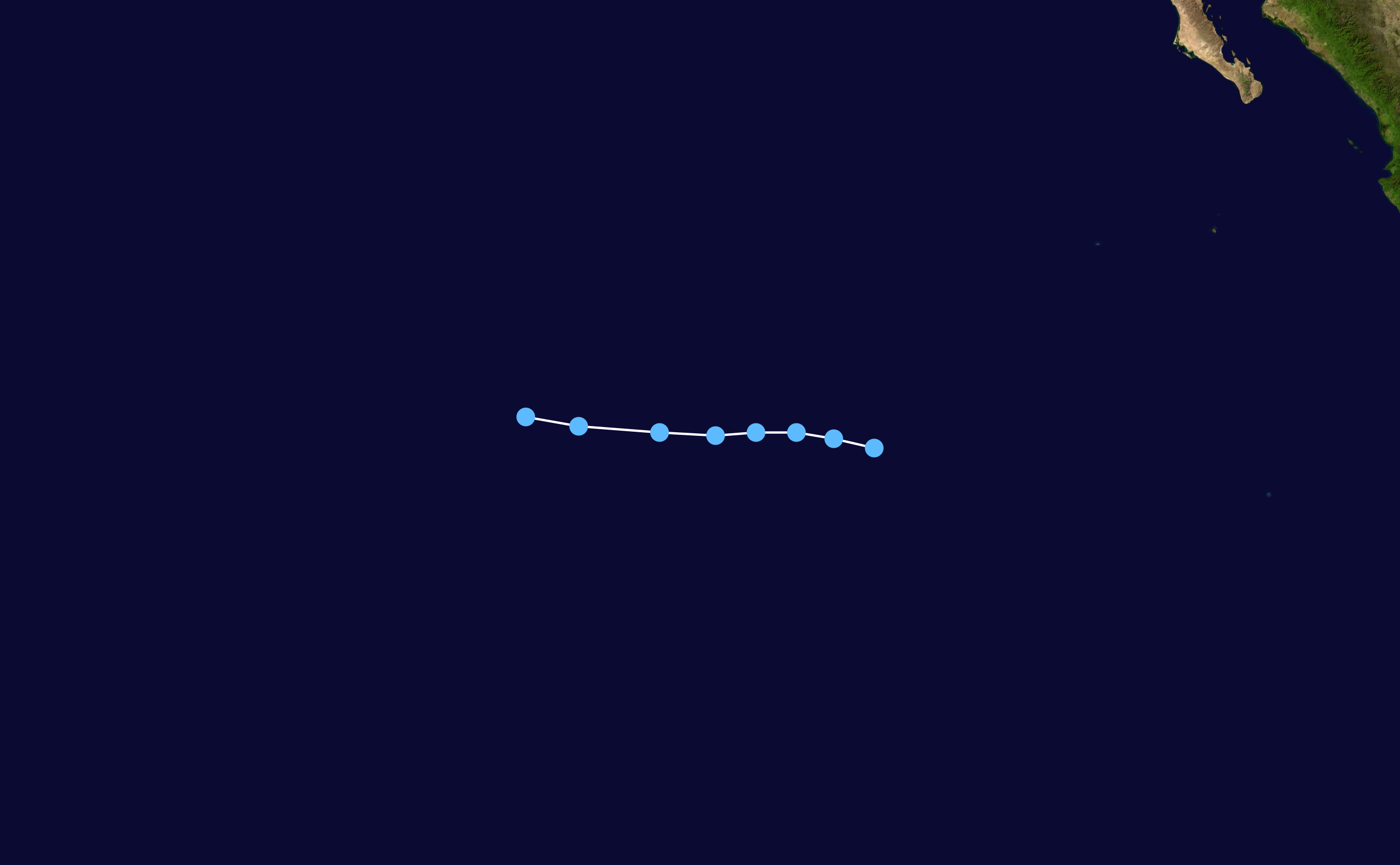
Storm path of Tropical Depression Three-E

- 06:00 UTC (11:00 p.m. PDT, June 27) at 12.3°N 125.7°W – Tropical Depression Three-E reaches a minimum barometric pressure of 1,006 mbar (29.71 inHg) about 1,265 mi (2,040 km) southwest of the southern tip of the Baja California peninsula.

==== June 29 ====
- 06:00 UTC (11:00 p.m. PDT, June 28) at 12.8°N 133.1°W – Tropical Depression Three-E is last noted as a tropical cyclone about 1,670 mi (2,685 km) west-southwest of the southern tip of the Baja California peninsula; it dissipates shortly thereafter.

=== July ===
==== July 9 ====
- 12:00 UTC (5:00 a.m. PDT) at 11.5°N 100.3°W – Tropical Depression Four-E forms from a tropical disturbance about 345 mi (555 km) south of Acapulco, Guerrero.

==== July 12 ====
- 06:00 UTC (11:00 p.m. PDT, July 11) at 14.2°N 113.6°W – Tropical Depression Four-E strengthens into Tropical Storm Cristina about 645 mi (1,040 km) south-southwest of the southern tip of the Baja California peninsula.

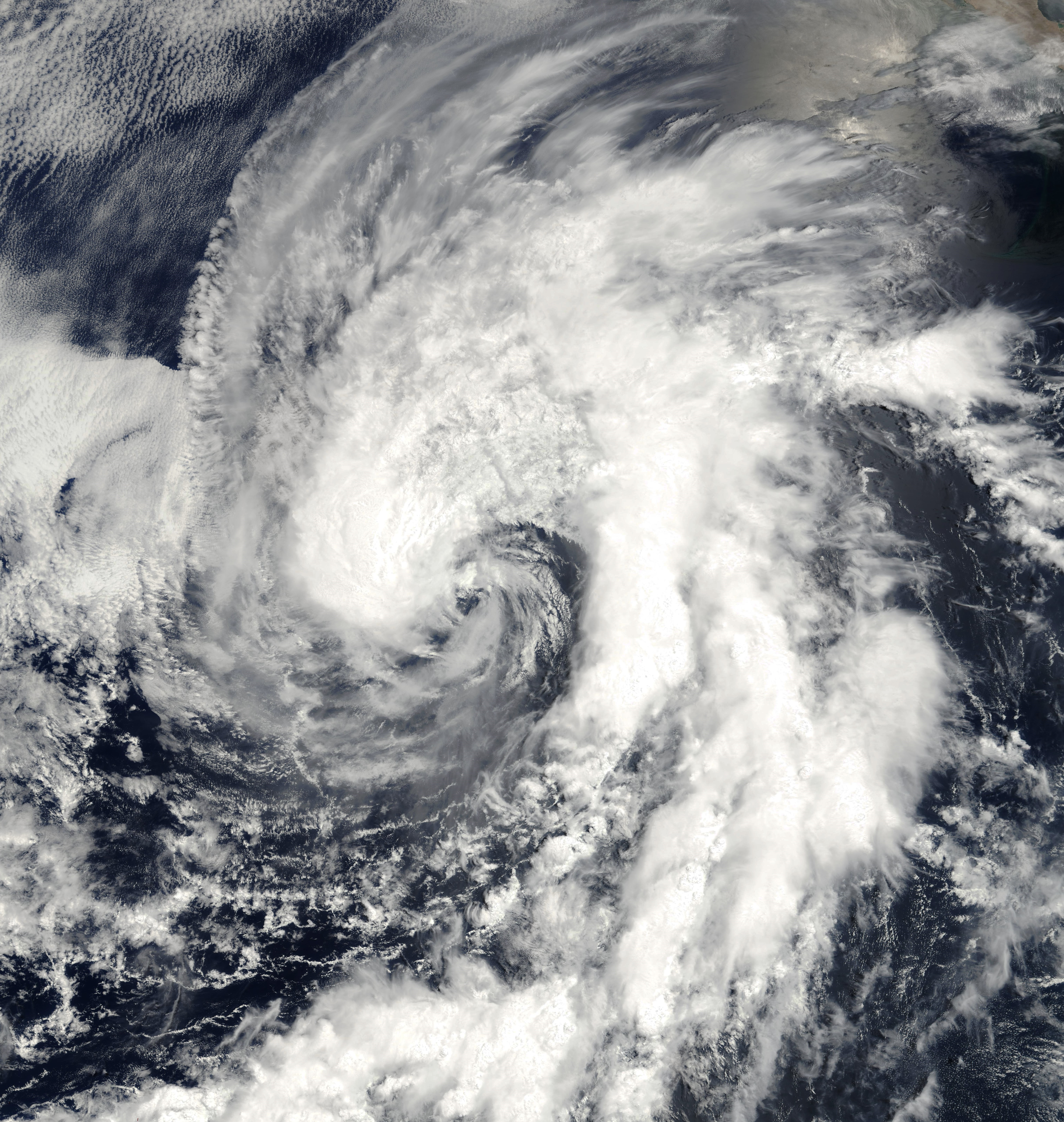
Satellite image of Tropical Storm Cristina on July 14

==== July 14 ====
- 12:00 UTC (5:00 a.m. PDT) at 16.6°N 117.8°W – Tropical Storm Cristina reaches maximum sustained winds of 65 mph (100 km/h) and a minimum barometric pressure of 994 mbar (29.35 inHg) about 670 mi (1,075 km) southwest of the southern tip of the Baja California peninsula.

==== July 15 ====
- 12:00 UTC (5:00 a.m. PDT) at 18.5°N 119.4°W – Tropical Storm Cristina weakens into a tropical depression about 680 mi (1,095 km) west-southwest of the southern tip of the Baja California peninsula.

==== July 16 ====
- 18:00 UTC (11:00 a.m. PDT) at 20.0°N 122.7°W – Tropical Depression Cristina is last noted as a tropical cyclone about 840 mi (1,355 km) west-southwest of the southern tip of the Baja California peninsula; it dissipates six hours later.

==== July 17 ====
- 06:00 UTC (8:00 p.m. HST, July 16) at 9.3°N 178.1°W – The Joint Typhoon Warning Center (JTWC) begins tracking a tropical depression over the extreme southwestern portion of the Central Pacific basin, though it is operationally classified as a tropical disturbance at the time.

==== July 19 ====
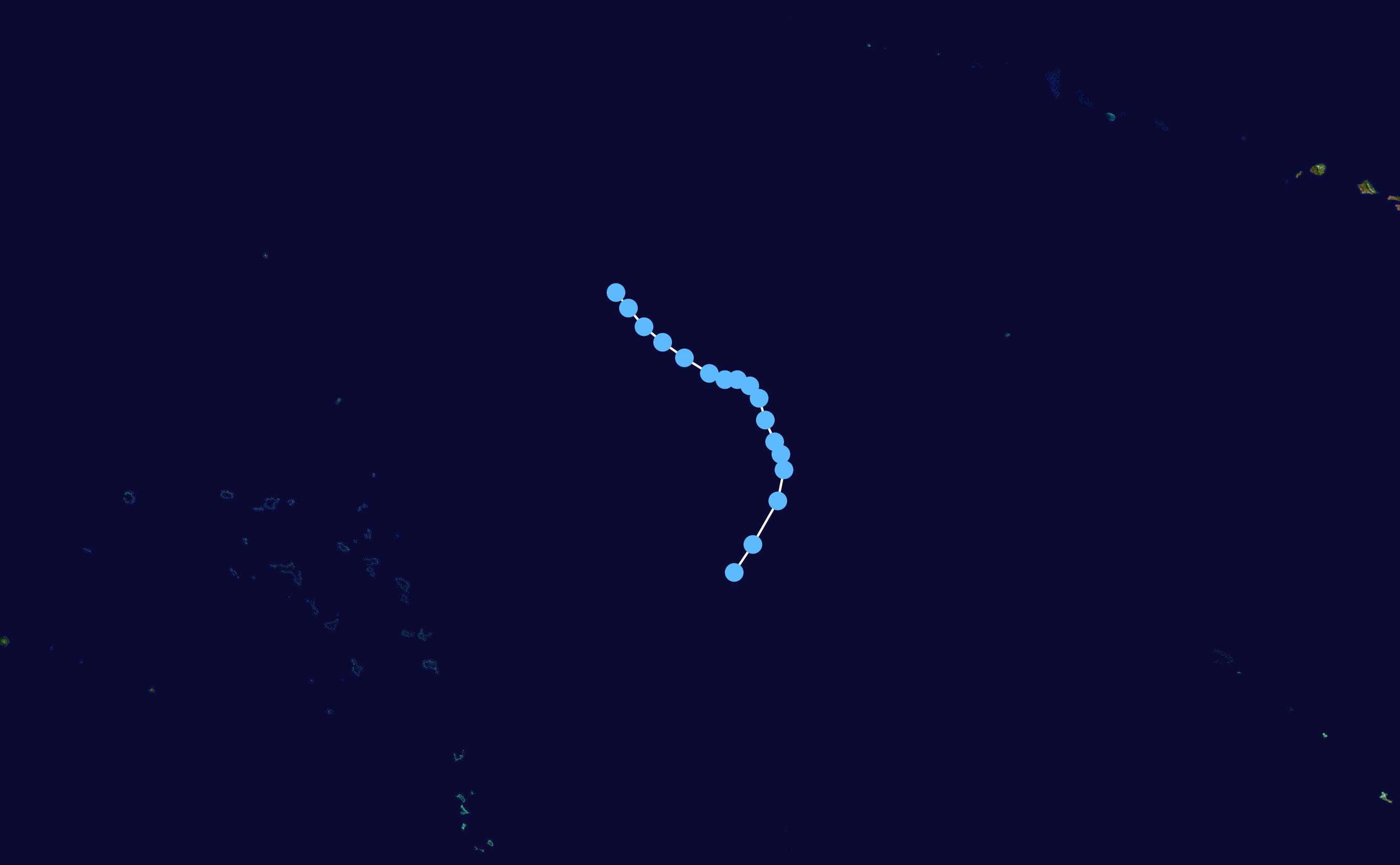
Storm path of Tropical Storm Kalmaegi of the annual typhoon season; the system was unofficially a tropical depression in the Central Pacific basin

- 00:00 UTC (2:00 p.m. HST, July 18) at 14.7°N 177.5°W – The JTWC issues a Tropical Cyclone Formation Alert for the aforementioned tropical depression.

==== July 20 ====
- 06:00 UTC (8:00 p.m. HST, July 19) at 16.1°N 179.6°W – The Japan Meteorological Agency (JMA), which is the primary Regional Specialized Meteorological Centre for the Western Pacific basin, begins tracking the tropical depression over the extreme southwestern Central Pacific basin. One hour later, the JMA reports that the tropical depression has crossed the International Date Line; the agency soon upgrades it to Tropical Storm Kalmaegi.
- 12:00 UTC (2:00 a.m. HST) at 16.5°N 179.4°E – The JTWC reports that the tropical depression has crossed the International Date Line; the agency issues its first official warning on the system six hours later, giving it the number 15W as part of the 2002 Pacific typhoon season.
- 12:00 UTC (5:00 a.m. PDT) at 13.2°N 106.4°W – Tropical Depression Five-E forms from a tropical wave about 425 mi (685 km) south-southwest of Manzanillo, Colima.
- 18:00 UTC (11:00 a.m. PDT) at 13.7°N 106.8°W – Tropical Depression Five-E strengthens into Tropical Storm Douglas about 405 mi (650 km) south-southwest of Manzanillo, Colima.

==== July 22 ====
Satellite image of Hurricane Douglas weakening late on July 23

- 00:00 UTC (5:00 p.m. PDT, July 21) at 17.0°N 110.3°W – Tropical Storm Douglas strengthens into a Category 1 hurricane about 420 mi (675 km) west-southwest of Manzanillo, Colima.
- 12:00 UTC (5:00 a.m. PDT) at 17.2°N 112.0°W – Hurricane Douglas strengthens to Category 2 intensity about 520 mi (835 km) west-southwest of Manzanillo, Colima.
- 18:00 UTC (11:00 a.m. PDT) at 17.2°N 112.7°W – Hurricane Douglas reaches maximum sustained winds of 105 mph (165 km/h) and a minimum barometric pressure of 970 mbar (28.64 inHg) about 565 mi (910 km) west-southwest of Manzanillo, Colima.

==== July 23 ====
- 06:00 UTC (11:00 p.m. PDT, July 22) at 11.6°N 96.7°W – Tropical Depression Six-E forms from a tropical wave about 295 mi (475 km) south of Puerto Escondido, Oaxaca.
- 12:00 UTC (5:00 a.m. PDT) at 11.9°N 98.5°W – Tropical Depression Six-E strengthens into Tropical Storm Elida about 290 mi (465 km) south-southwest of Puerto Escondido, Oaxaca.
- 18:00 UTC (11:00 a.m. PDT) at 18.2°N 115.7°W – Hurricane Douglas weakens to Category 1 intensity about 750 mi (1,205 km) west of Manzanillo, Colima.

==== July 24 ====
- 06:00 UTC (11:00 p.m. PDT, July 23) at 12.3°N 103.7°W – Tropical Storm Elida strengthens into a Category 1 hurricane about 505 mi (815 km) west-southwest of Puerto Escondido, Oaxaca.
- 12:00 UTC (5:00 a.m. PDT) at 12.7°N 105.1°W – Hurricane Elida rapidly strengthens to Category 3 intensity, skipping Category 2 status, about 580 mi (935 km) west-southwest of Puerto Escondido, Oaxaca. This makes it the second major hurricane of the season.
- 18:00 UTC (11:00 a.m. PDT) at 20.5°N 121.8°W – Hurricane Douglas weakens into a tropical storm about 1,140 mi (1,835 km) west of Manzanillo, Colima.
- 18:00 UTC (11:00 a.m. PDT) at 13.2°N 106.6°W – Hurricane Elida strengthens to Category 4 intensity about 660 mi (1,065 km) west-southwest of Puerto Escondido, Oaxaca.

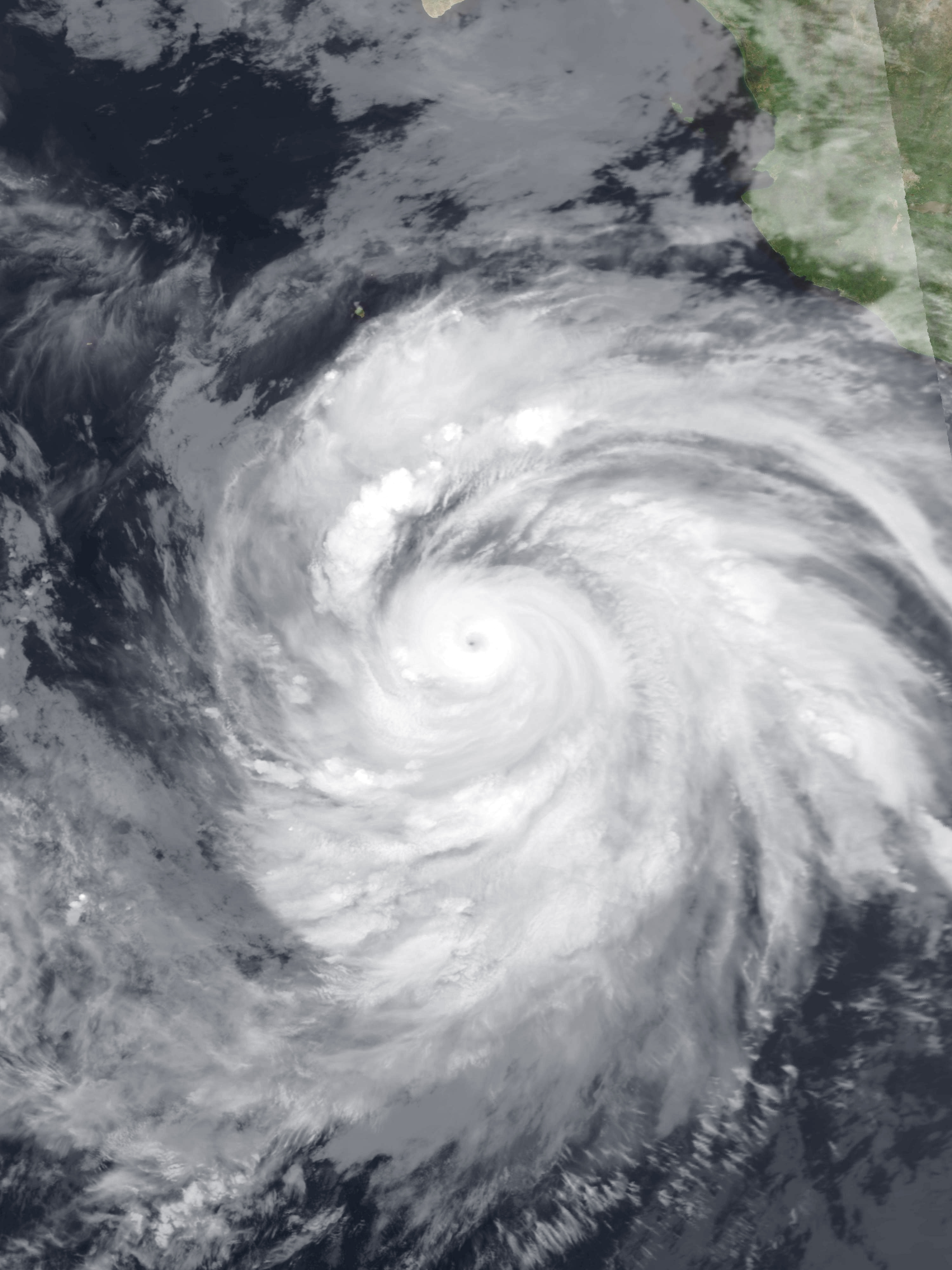
Satellite image of Hurricane Elida at peak intensity early on July 25

==== July 25 ====
- 06:00 UTC (11:00 p.m. PDT) at 14.3°N 109.5°W – Hurricane Elida strengthens to Category 5 intensity about 835 mi (1,345 km) west of Puerto Escondido, Oaxaca, making it the first of three such storms this season. It simultaneously reaches maximum sustained winds of 160 mph (260 km/h) and a minimum barometric pressure of 921 mbar (27.20 inHg).
- 12:00 UTC (5:00 a.m. PDT) at 14.7°N 111.0°W – Hurricane Elida weakens to Category 4 intensity about 930 mi (1,500 km) west of Puerto Escondido, Oaxaca.

==== July 26 ====
- 00:00 UTC (5:00 p.m. PDT, July 25) at 21.0°N 131.3°W – Tropical Storm Douglas weakens into a tropical depression about 1,755 mi (2,825 km) west of Manzanillo, Colima.
- 00:00 UTC (5:00 p.m. PDT, July 25) at 15.1°N 113.8°W – Hurricane Elida weakens to Category 3 intensity about 1,115 mi (1,800 km) west of Puerto Escondido, Oaxaca.
- 18:00 UTC (11:00 a.m. PDT) at 21.6°N 137.3°W – Tropical Depression Douglas degenerates into a remnant low about 1,150 mi (1,855 km) east of the Hawaiian Islands.
- 18:00 UTC (11:00 a.m. PDT) at 16.0°N 117.1°W – Hurricane Elida weakens to Category 2 intensity about 1,250 mi (2,010 km) south of Los Angeles, California.

==== July 27 ====
- 06:00 UTC (11:00 p.m. PDT, July 26) at 16.8°N 119.2°W – Hurricane Elida weakens to Category 1 intensity about 1,190 mi (1,920 km) south of Los Angeles, California.
- 18:00 UTC (11:00 a.m. PDT) at 17.8°N 121.4°W – Hurricane Elida weakens into a tropical storm about 1,140 mi (1,835 km) south of Los Angeles, California.

==== July 29 ====
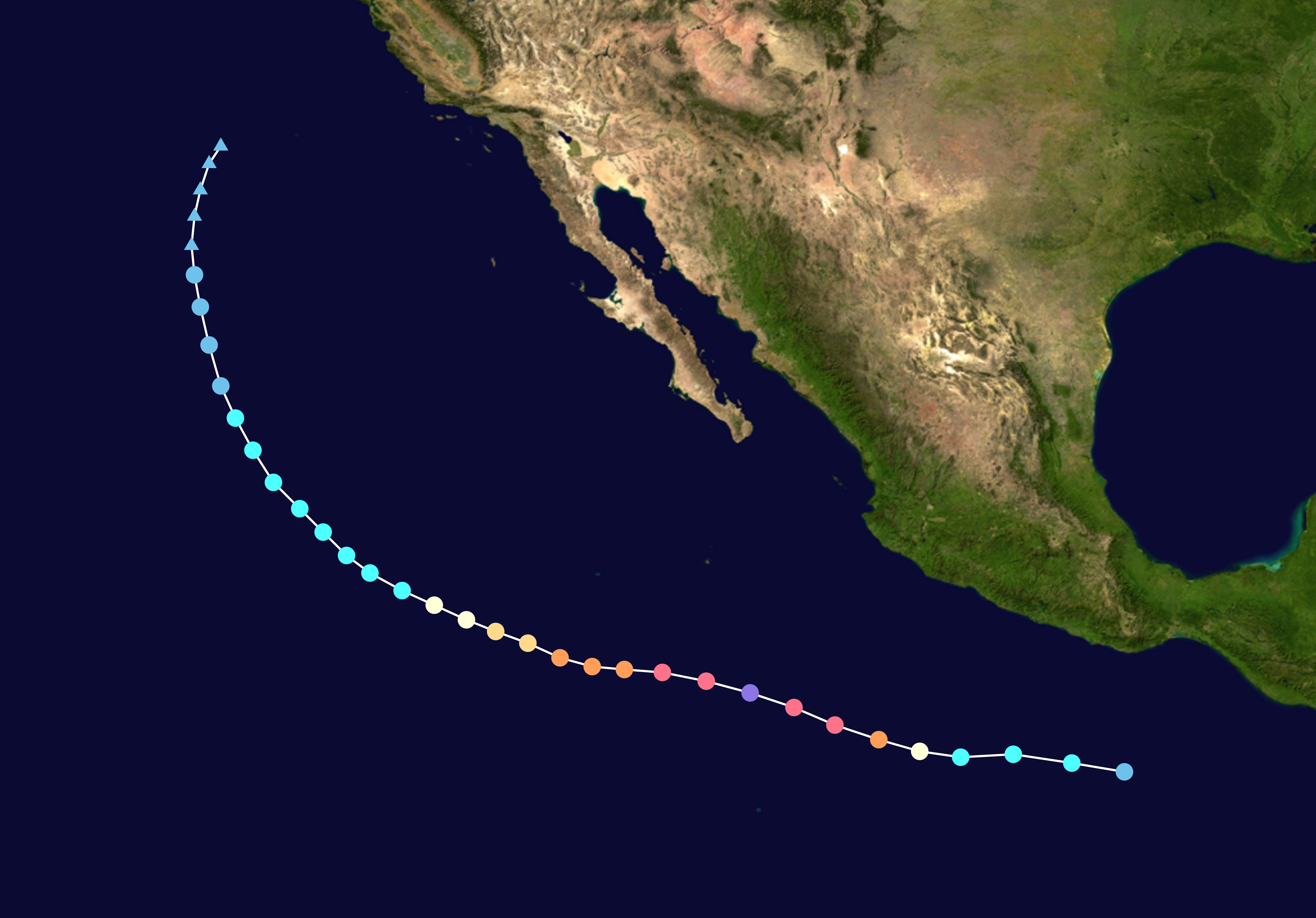
Storm path of Hurricane Elida

- 18:00 UTC (11:00 a.m. PDT) at 24.8°N 127.6°W – Tropical Storm Elida weakens into a tropical depression about 850 mi (1,370 km) southwest of Los Angeles, California.

==== July 30 ====
- 18:00 UTC (11:00 a.m. PDT) at 29.6°N 128.6°W – Tropical Depression Elida degenerates into a remnant low about 680 mi (1,095 km) west-southwest of Los Angeles, California.

=== August ===
==== August 6 ====
- 00:00 UTC (5:00 p.m. PDT, August 5) at 13.0°N 118.9°W – Tropical Depression Seven-E forms from a tropical wave about 900 mi (1,445 km) southwest of the southern tip of the Baja California peninsula.
- 06:00 UTC (11:00 p.m. PDT, August 5) at 13.9°N 119.8°W – Tropical Depression Seven-E reaches maximum sustained winds of 35 mph (55 km/h) and a minimum barometric pressure of 1,008 mbar (29.77 inHg) about 890 mi (1,435 km) southwest of the southern tip of the Baja California peninsula.

==== August 8 ====
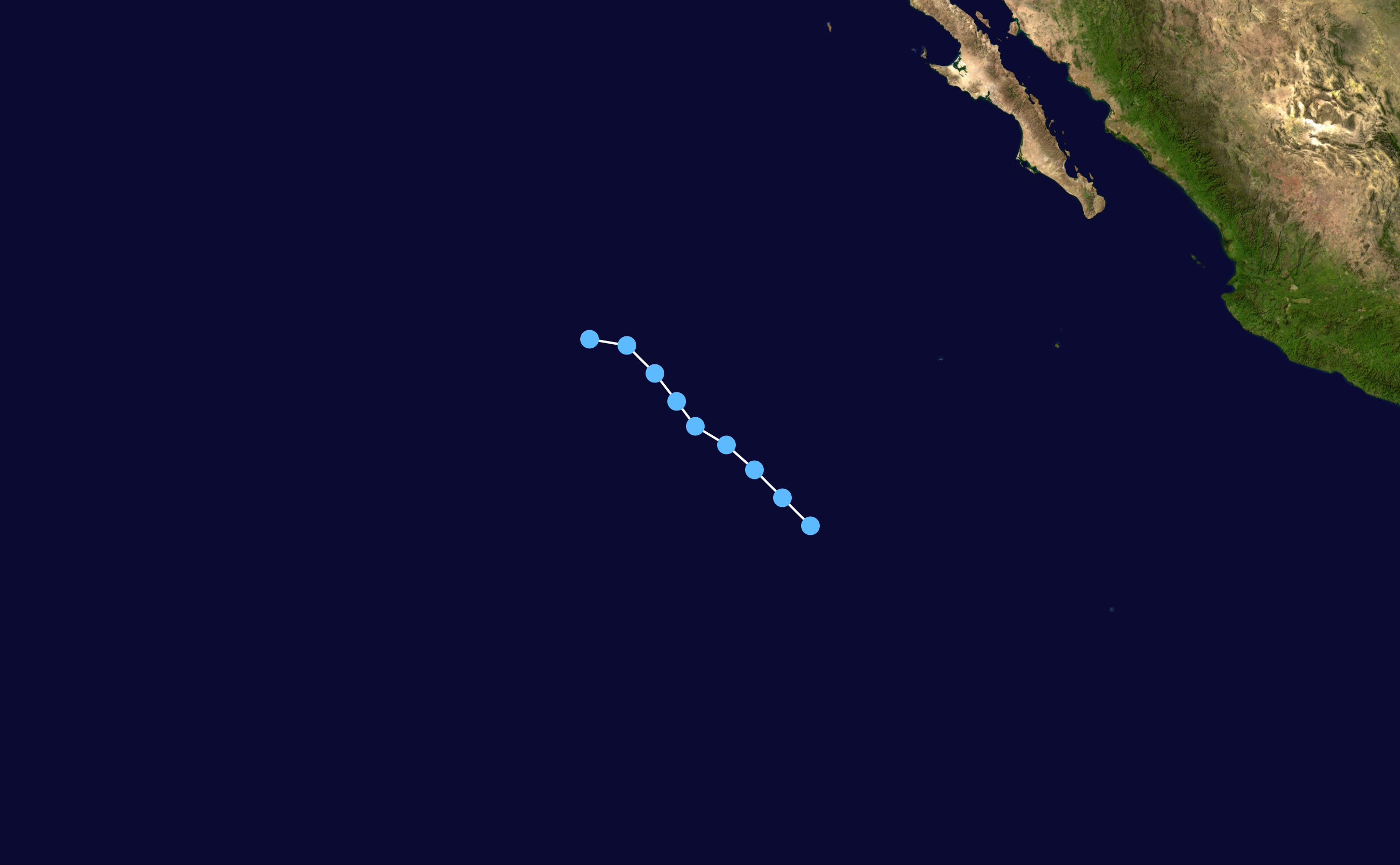
Storm path of Tropical Depression Seven‑E

- 00:00 UTC (5:00 p.m. PDT, August 5) at 19.0°N 126.0°W – Tropical Depression Seven-E is last noted as a tropical cyclone about 1,070 mi (1,725 km) west-southwest of the southern tip of the Baja California peninsula; it dissipates six hours later.

==== August 21 ====
- 12:00 UTC (5:00 a.m. PDT) at 12.8°N 106.9°W – A tropical depression forms from a tropical wave about 460 mi (740 km) south-southwest of Manzanillo, Colima.

==== August 22 ====
- 00:00 UTC (5:00 p.m. PDT, August 21) at 12.8°N 108.6°W – The aforementioned tropical depression strengthens into Tropical Storm Fausto about 520 mi (835 km) south-southwest of Manzanillo, Colima.
- 18:00 UTC (11:00 a.m. PDT) at 13.7°N 112.3°W – Tropical Storm Fausto strengthens into a Category 1 hurricane about 650 mi (1,045 km) south-southwest of Cabo San Lucas, Baja California Sur.
- 18:00 UTC (8:00 a.m. HST) at 10.7°N 142.7°W – Tropical Depression One-C forms from an area of disturbed weather about 1,245 mi (2,000 km) southeast of Honolulu, Hawaii.

==== August 23 ====
- 12:00 UTC (5:00 a.m. PDT) at 14.7°N 116.5°W – Hurricane Fausto strengthens to Category 2 intensity about 710 mi (1,140 km) southwest of Cabo San Lucas, Baja California Sur.
- 18:00 UTC (11:00 a.m. PDT) at 15.0°N 117.9°W – Hurricane Fausto strengthens to Category 3 intensity about 755 mi (1,215 km) southwest of Cabo San Lucas, Baja California Sur, making it the third major hurricane of the season.

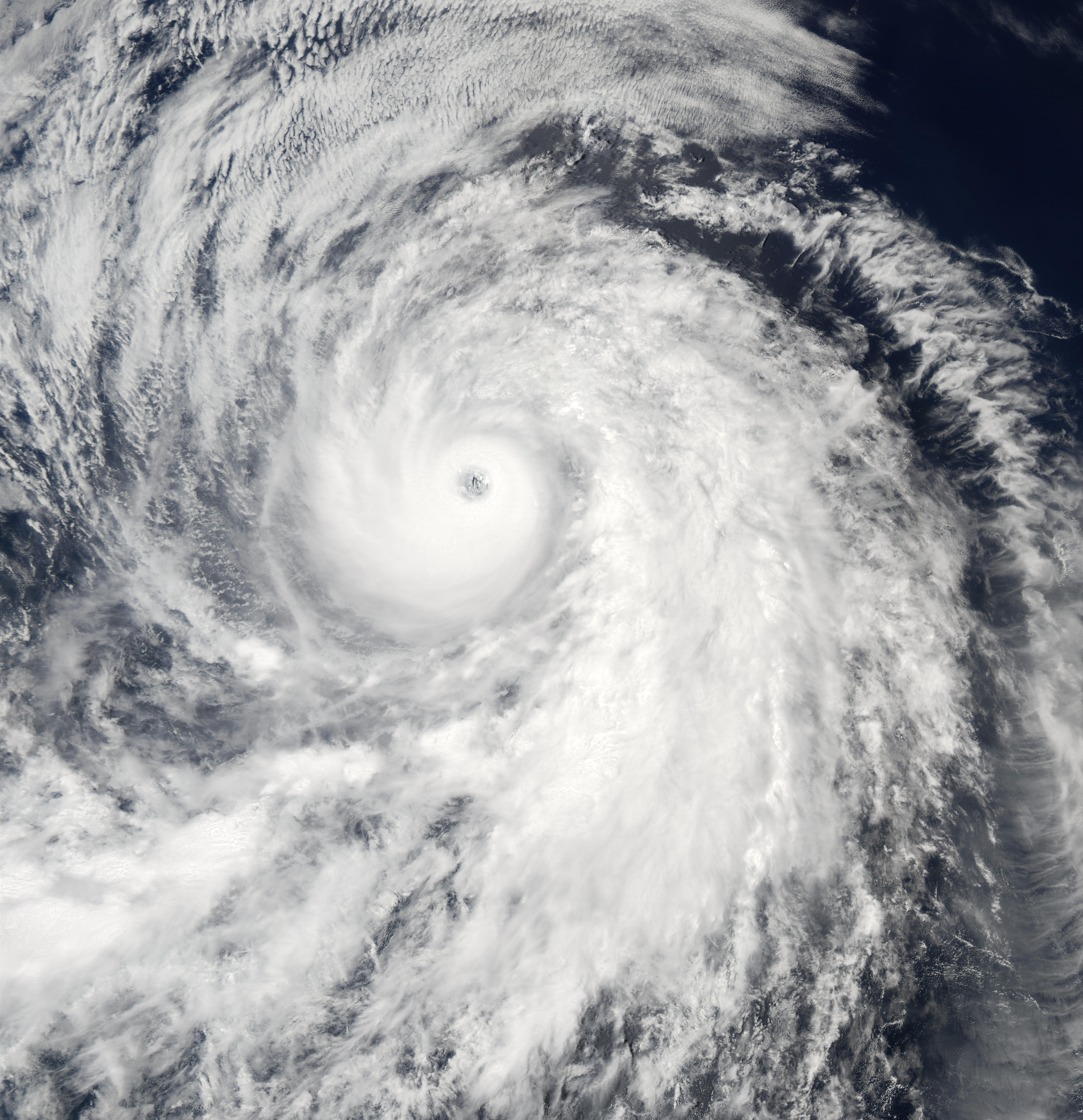
Satellite image of Hurricane Fausto near peak intensity on August 24

==== August 24 ====
- 06:00 UTC (11:00 p.m. PDT, August 23) at 15.3°N 120.5°W – Hurricane Fausto strengthens to Category 4 intensity about 865 mi (1,390 km) southwest of Cabo San Lucas, Baja California Sur.
- 12:00 UTC (5:00 a.m. PDT) at 15.7°N 121.8°W – Hurricane Fausto reaches maximum sustained winds of 145 mph (230 km/h) and a minimum barometric pressure of 936 mbar (27.64 inHg) about 915 mi (1,475 km) southwest of Cabo San Lucas, Baja California Sur.

==== August 25 ====
- 00:00 UTC (2:00 p.m. HST, August 24) at 12.2°N 150.7°W – Tropical Depression One-C strengthens into Tropical Storm Alika about 790 mi (1,270 km) southeast of Honolulu, Hawaii.
- 00:00 UTC (2:00 p.m. HST, August 24) at 9.8°N 157.6°W – Tropical Depression Two-C forms from an area of disturbed weather about 795 mi (1,280 km) south of Honolulu, Hawaii. (Note: While the Northeast and North Central Pacific hurricane database (HURDAT) lists a formation time of 00:00 UTC on August 25 for Tropical Depression Two-C – which eventually became Hurricane Ele – the CPHC stated in their seasonal summary that the system did not develop until 48 hours later.)
- 06:00 UTC (11:00 p.m. PDT, August 24) at 17.2°N 125.2°W – Hurricane Fausto weakens to Category 3 intensity about 1,065 mi (1,715 km) west-southwest of Cabo San Lucas, Baja California Sur.
- 06:00 UTC (8:00 p.m. HST, August 24) at 12.7°N 151.5°W – Tropical Storm Alika reaches maximum sustained winds of 65 mph (100 km/h) and a minimum barometric pressure of 995 mbar (29.38 inHg) about 725 mi (1,165 km) southeast of Honolulu, Hawaii.
- 12:00 UTC (5:00 a.m. PDT) at 17.8°N 126.5°W – Hurricane Fausto weakens to Category 2 intensity about 1,130 mi (1,815 km) west-southwest of Cabo San Lucas, Baja California Sur.

==== August 26 ====
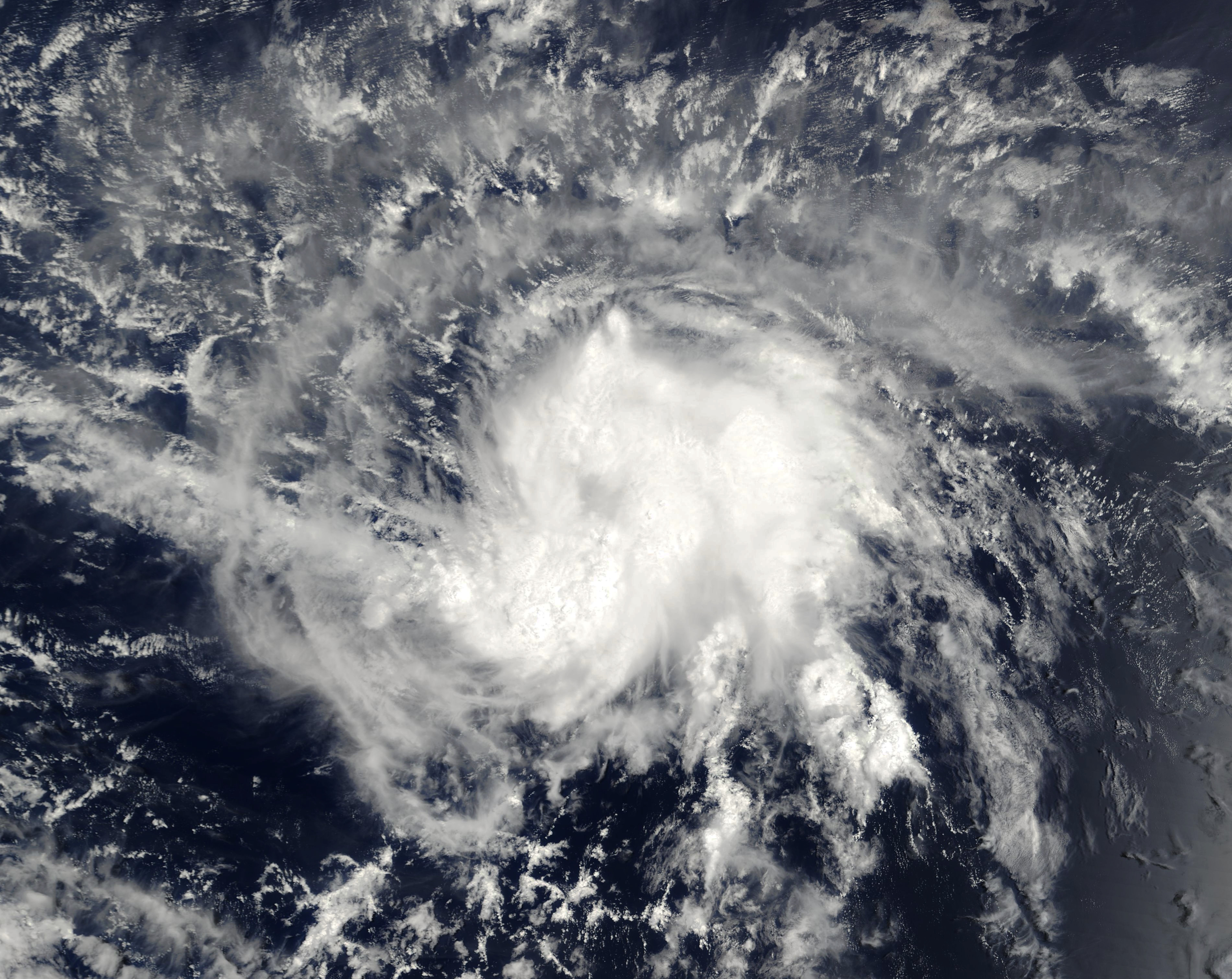
Satellite image of Tropical Storm Alika late on August 25

- 00:00 UTC (5:00 p.m. PDT, August 25) at 14.7°N 110.4°W – A tropical depression forms from a tropical wave about 565 mi (910 km) south of the southern tip of the Baja California peninsula.
- 06:00 UTC (11:00 p.m. PDT, August 25) at 20.2°N 130.7°W – Hurricane Fausto weakens to Category 1 intensity about 1,345 mi (2,170 km) west of Cabo San Lucas, Baja California Sur.
- 12:00 UTC (5:00 a.m. PDT) at 20.9°N 132.1°W – Hurricane Fausto weakens into a tropical storm about 1,420 mi (2,290 km) west of Cabo San Lucas, Baja California Sur.

==== August 27 ====
- 00:00 UTC (2:00 p.m. HST, August 26) at 14.6°N 160.4°W – Tropical Storm Alika weakens into a tropical depression about 495 mi (795 km) south-southwest of Honolulu, Hawaii.
- 00:00 UTC (5:00 p.m. PDT, August 26) at 14.0°N 113.2°W – The tropical depression that had formed 24 hours earlier strengthens into Tropical Storm Genevieve about 650 mi (1,045 km) south-southwest of the southern tip of the Baja California peninsula.
- 06:00 UTC (8:00 p.m. HST, August 26) at 10.2°N 168.7°W – Tropical Depression Two-C strengthens into Tropical Storm Ele about 1,055 mi (1,695 km) southwest of Honolulu, Hawaii.
- 18:00 UTC (11:00 a.m. PDT) at 14.1°N 114.9°W – Tropical Storm Genevieve reaches maximum sustained winds of 70 mph (110 km/h) about 685 mi (1,105 km) south-southwest of the southern tip of the Baja California peninsula.
- Just after 18:00 UTC (8:00 a.m. HST) near 24.3°N 139.8°W – Tropical Storm Fausto crosses into the Central Pacific basin about 1,170 mi (1,880 km) east of Honolulu, Hawaii.

==== August 28 ====
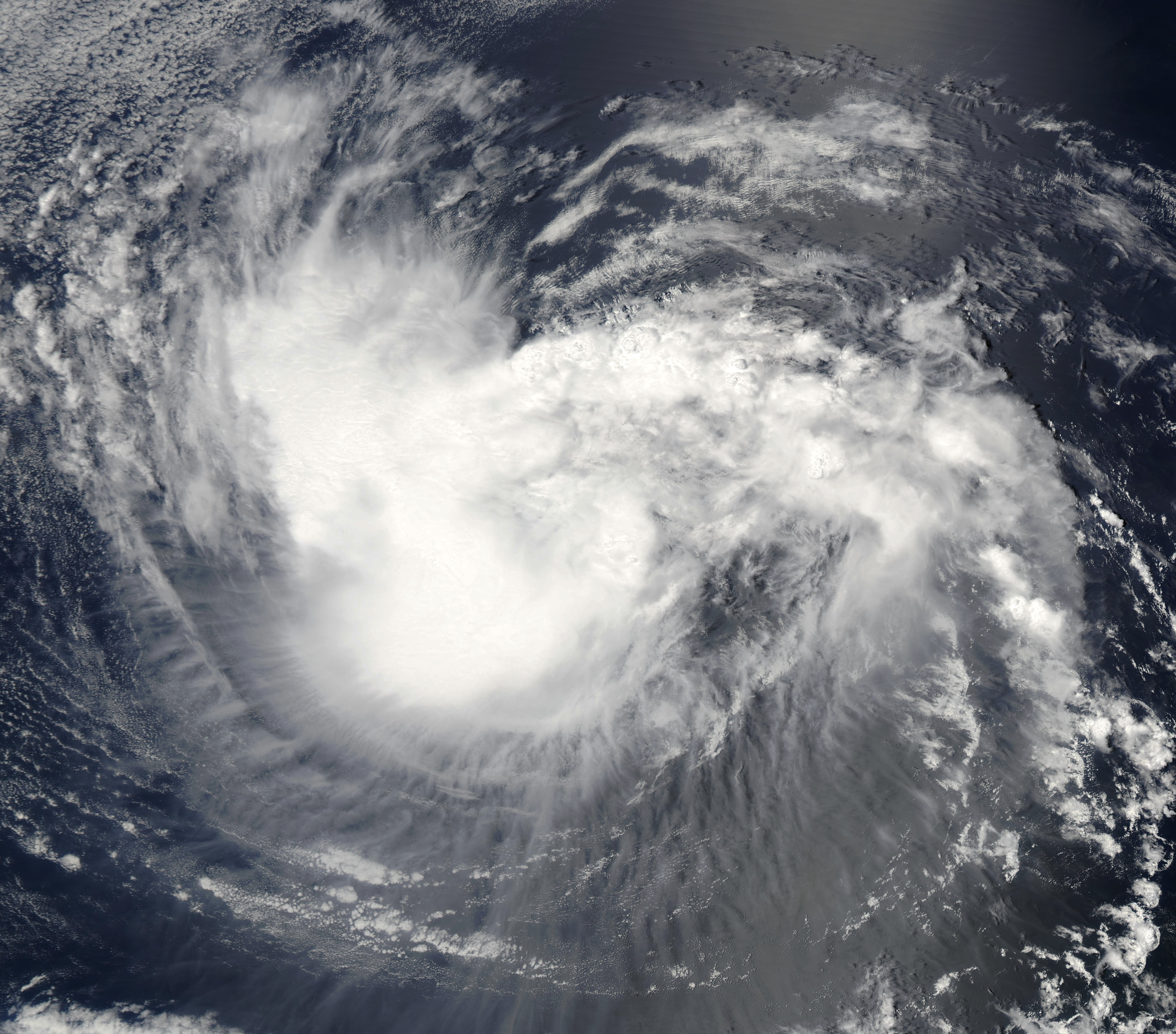
Satellite image of Tropical Storm Genevieve late on August 28

- 00:00 UTC (2:00 p.m. HST, August 27) at 25.3°N 141.2°W – Tropical Storm Fausto weakens into a tropical depression about 1,095 mi (1,760 km) east-northeast of Honolulu, Hawaii.
- 00:00 UTC (2:00 p.m. HST, August 27) at 9.7°N 173.2°W – Tropical Storm Ele strengthens into a Category 1 hurricane about 1,295 mi (2,085 km) southwest of Honolulu, Hawaii.
- 00:00 UTC (5:00 p.m. PDT, August 27) at 14.6°N 115.5°W – Tropical Storm Genevieve reaches a minimum barometric pressure of 989 mbar (29.21 inHg) about 680 mi (1,095 km) south-southwest of the southern tip of the Baja California peninsula.
- 06:00 UTC (8:00 p.m. HST, August 27) at 16.2°N 168.9°W – Tropical Depression Alika is last noted as a tropical cyclone about 805 mi (1,295 km) west-southwest of Honolulu, Hawaii; it dissipates shortly thereafter.
- 12:00 UTC (2:00 a.m HST) at 26.8°N 145.0°W – Tropical Depression Fausto degenerates into a remnant low about 890 mi (1,435 km) east-northeast of Honolulu, Hawaii.

==== August 29 ====
- 06:00 UTC (8:00 p.m. HST, August 28) at 10.9°N 178.0°W – Hurricane Ele strengthens to Category 2 intensity about 1,515 mi (2,435 km) west-southwest of Honolulu, Hawaii.
- 18:00 UTC (8:00 a.m. HST) at 11.7°N 179.2°W – Hurricane Ele strengthens to Category 3 intensity about 1,560 mi (2,510 km) west-southwest of Honolulu, Hawaii, making it the fourth major hurricane of the season.

==== August 30 ====
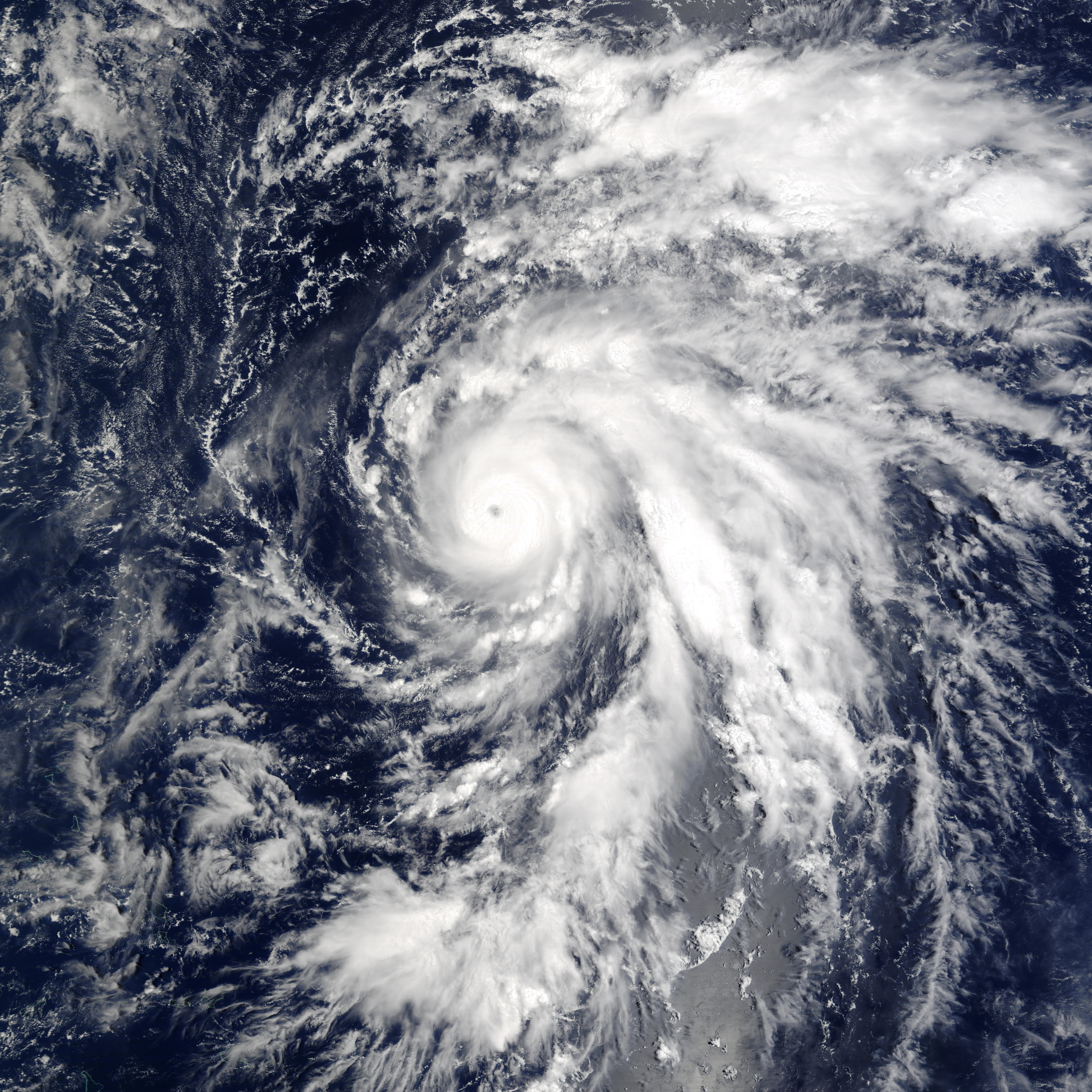
Satellite image of Typhoon Ele just west of the International Date Line on August 30

- 00:00 UTC (2:00 p.m. HST) at 12.1°N 179.9°W – Hurricane Ele reaches sustained winds of 125 mph (205 km/h) and a barometric pressure of 945 mbar (27.91 inHg) about 1,590 mi (2,555 km) west-southwest of Honolulu, Hawaii. This is Ele's peak intensity while in the Central Pacific basin; it crosses the International Date Line shortly afterwards and is re-designated as Typhoon Ele in the Western Pacific basin.
- 06:00 UTC (11:00 p.m. PDT, August 29) at 13.5°N 103.1°W – A tropical depression forms from an interaction between a tropical wave and the Intertropical Convergence Zone about 390 mi (630 km) south-southeast of Manzanillo, Colima.
- 12:00 UTC (5:00 a.m. PDT) at 20.2°N 122.7°W – Tropical Storm Genevieve weakens into a tropical depression about 840 mi (1,355 km) west-southwest of the southern tip of the Baja California peninsula.
- 12:00 UTC (5:00 a.m. PDT) at 13.9°N 103.4°W – The tropical depression that formed six hours earlier strengthens into Tropical Storm Hernan about 365 mi (585 km) south of Manzanillo, Colima.
- 18:00 UTC (8:00 a.m. HST) at 30.0°N 157.3°W – The remnants of Fausto regenerate into a tropical depression about 600 mi (965 km) north of Honolulu, Hawaii.

==== August 31 ====
- 06:00 UTC (11:00 p.m. PDT, August 30) at 15.1°N 105.8°W – Tropical Storm Hernan strengthens into a Category 1 hurricane about 290 mi (465 km) south-southwest of Manzanillo, Colima.
- 12:00 UTC (5:00 a.m. PDT) at 15.3°N 106.9°W – Hurricane Hernan strengthens to Category 2 intensity about 310 mi (500 km) southwest of Manzanillo, Colima.
- 18:00 UTC (11:00 a.m. PDT) at 15.7°N 107.8°W – Hurricane Hernan strengthens to Category 3 intensity about 330 mi (530 km) southwest of Manzanillo, Colima, making it the fifth major hurricane of the season.

=== September ===
==== September 1 ====
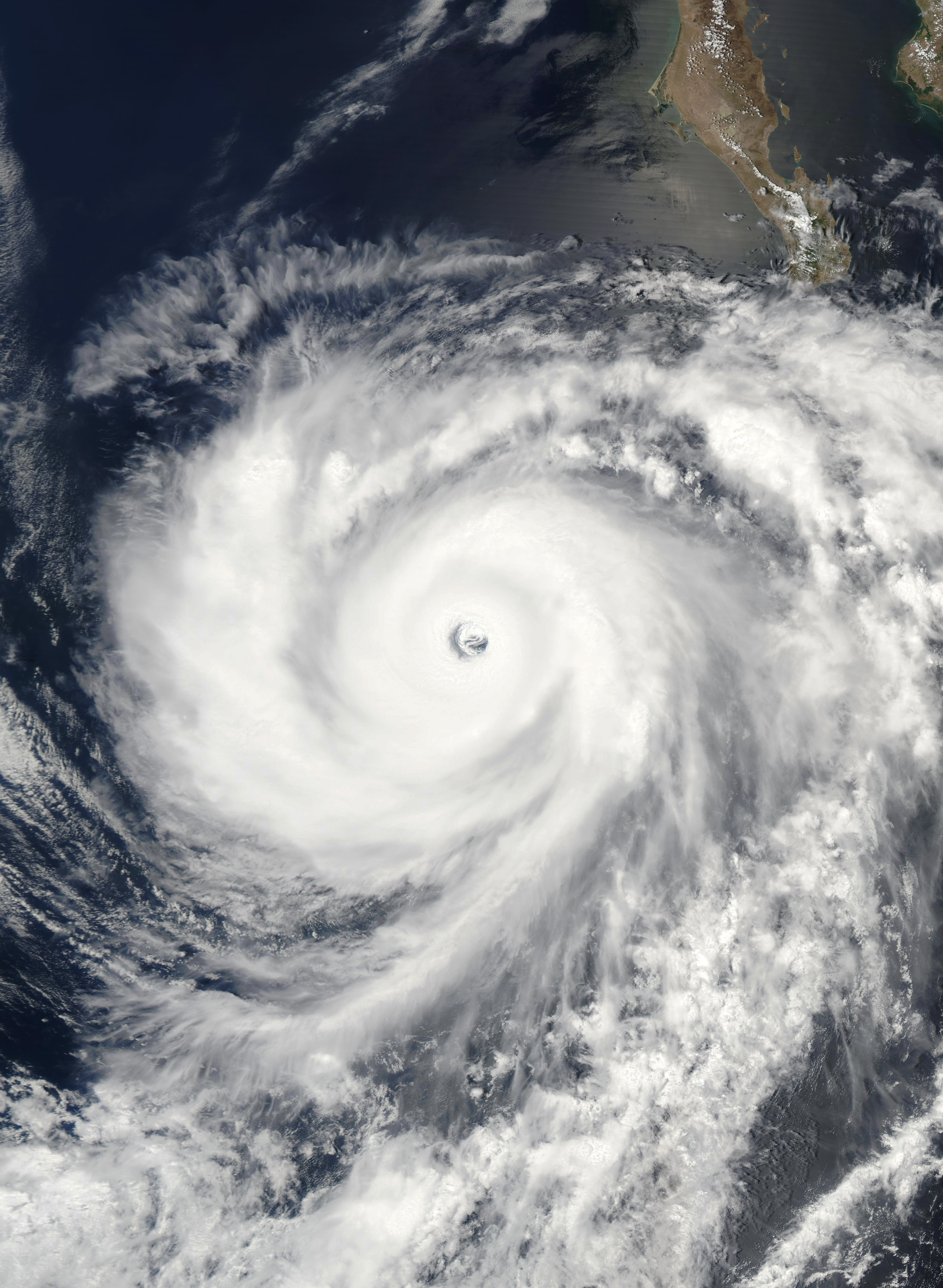
Satellite image of Hurricane Hernan near peak intensity late on September 1

- 00:00 UTC (2:00 p.m. HST, August 31) at 33.3°N 163.8°W – The barometric pressure of Tropical Depression Fausto reaches a secondary minimum of 1,009 mbar (29.80 inHg) about 905 mi (1,455 km) north-northwest of Honolulu, Hawaii.
- 00:00 UTC (5:00 p.m. PDT, August 31) at 16.5°N 108.8°W – Hurricane Hernan strengthens to Category 4 intensity about 345 mi (555 km) west-southwest of Manzanillo, Colima.
- 06:00 UTC (11:00 p.m. PDT, August 31) at 24.9°N 127.0°W – Tropical Depression Genevieve is last noted as a tropical cyclone about 1,080 mi (1,740 km) west of the southern tip of the Baja California peninsula; it dissipates shortly thereafter.
- 12:00 UTC (5:00 a.m. PDT) at 17.7°N 111.1°W – Hurricane Hernan strengthens to Category 5 intensity about 395 mi (640 km) south of the southern tip of the Baja California peninsula, becoming the second of three such storms this season. It simultaneously reaches maximum sustained winds of 160 mph (260 km/h) and a minimum barometric pressure of 921 mbar (27.20 inHg).
- 18:00 UTC (8:00 a.m. HST) at 34.6°N 167.4°W – Tropical Depression Fausto restrengthens into a tropical storm about 1,090 mi (1,750 km) northwest of Honolulu, Hawaii; its sustained winds simultaneously reach a secondary peak of 40 mph (65 km/h).

==== September 2 ====
- 00:00 UTC (5:00 p.m. PDT, September 1) at 17.9°N 113.3°W – Hurricane Hernan weakens to Category 4 intensity about 410 mi (660 km) south-southwest of the southern tip of the Baja California peninsula.
- 12:00 UTC (5:00 a.m. PDT) at 18.4°N 115.4°W – Hurricane Hernan weakens to Category 3 intensity about 465 mi (750 km) southwest of the southern tip of the Baja California peninsula.

==== September 3 ====
- 00:00 UTC (2:00 p.m. HST, September 2) at 43.1°N 169.8°W – Tropical Storm Fausto is last noted as a tropical cyclone about 1,655 mi (2,670 km) north-northwest of Honolulu, Hawaii; it is absorbed by an extratropical cyclone six hours later.
- 00:00 UTC (5:00 p.m. PDT, September 2) at 18.7°N 117.3°W – Hurricane Hernan weakens to Category 2 intensity about 550 mi (890 km) west-southwest of the southern tip of the Baja California peninsula.
- 18:00 UTC (11:00 a.m. PDT) at 19.2°N 120.1°W – Hurricane Hernan weakens to Category 1 intensity about 700 mi (1,130 km) west-southwest of the southern tip of the Baja California peninsula.

==== September 4 ====
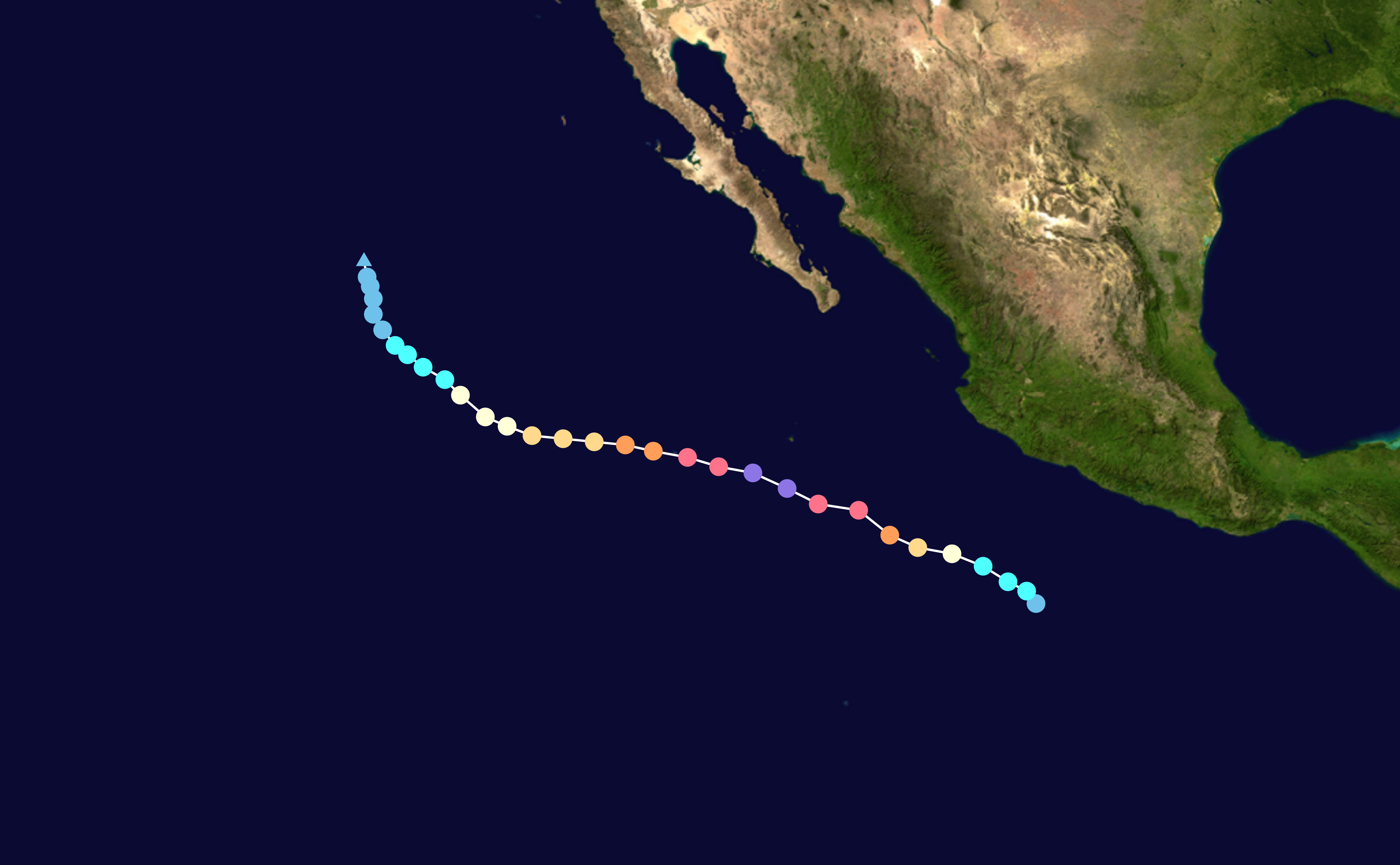
Storm path of Hurricane Hernan

- 12:00 UTC (5:00 a.m. PDT) at 20.7°N 122.1°W – Hurricane Hernan weakens into a tropical storm about 795 mi (1,280 km) west-southwest of the southern tip of the Baja California peninsula.

==== September 5 ====
- 12:00 UTC (5:00 a.m. PDT) at 22.3°N 124.1°W – Tropical Storm Hernan weakens into a tropical depression about 905 mi (1,455 km) west of the southern tip of the Baja California peninsula.
- 18:00 UTC (11:00 a.m. PDT) at 18.9°N 107.2°W – Tropical Depression Eleven-E forms from an area of unsettled weather about 140 mi (220 km) southwest of Cabo Corrientes, Jalisco.

==== September 6 ====
- 00:00 UTC (5:00 p.m. PDT, September 5) at 19.6°N 108.0°W – Tropical Depression Eleven-E reaches maximum sustained winds of 35 mph (55 km/h) about 160 mi (260 km) west-southwest of Cabo Corrientes, Jalisco.
- 18:00 UTC (11:00 a.m. PDT) at 24.5°N 124.7°W – Tropical Depression Hernan degenerates into a remnant low about 940 mi (1,510 km) west of the southern tip of the Baja California peninsula.

==== September 7 ====
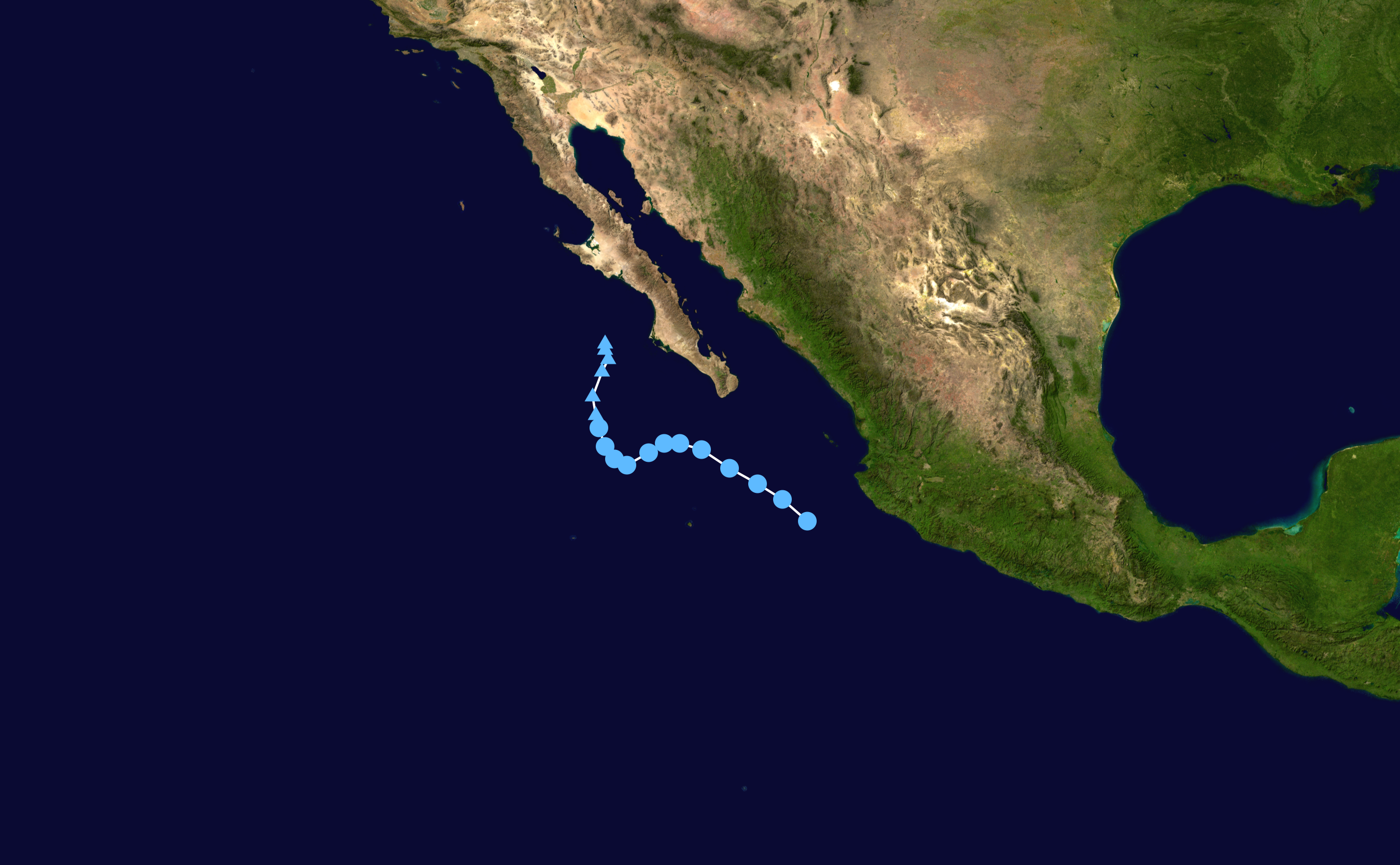
Storm path of Tropical Depression Eleven-E

- 06:00 UTC (11:00 p.m. PDT, September 6) at 21.4°N 111.8°W – Tropical Depression Eleven-E reaches a minimum barometric pressure of 1,006 mbar (29.71 inHg) about 155 mi (250 km) southwest of the southern tip of the Baja California peninsula.

==== September 8 ====
- 18:00 UTC (11:00 a.m. PDT) at 22.3°N 114.0°W – Tropical Depression Eleven-E degenerates into a remnant low about 260 mi (415 km) west of the southern tip of the Baja California peninsula.

==== September 15 ====
- 06:00 UTC (11:00 a.m. PDT, September 14) at 15.2°N 103.8°W – A tropical depression forms from a tropical wave about 270 mi (435 km) south of Manzanillo, Colima.

==== September 16 ====
- 00:00 UTC (5:00 p.m. PDT, September 15) at 16.9°N 106.8°W – The aforementioned tropical depression strengthens into Tropical Storm Iselle about 220 mi (350 km) southwest of Manzanillo, Colima.

==== September 17 ====
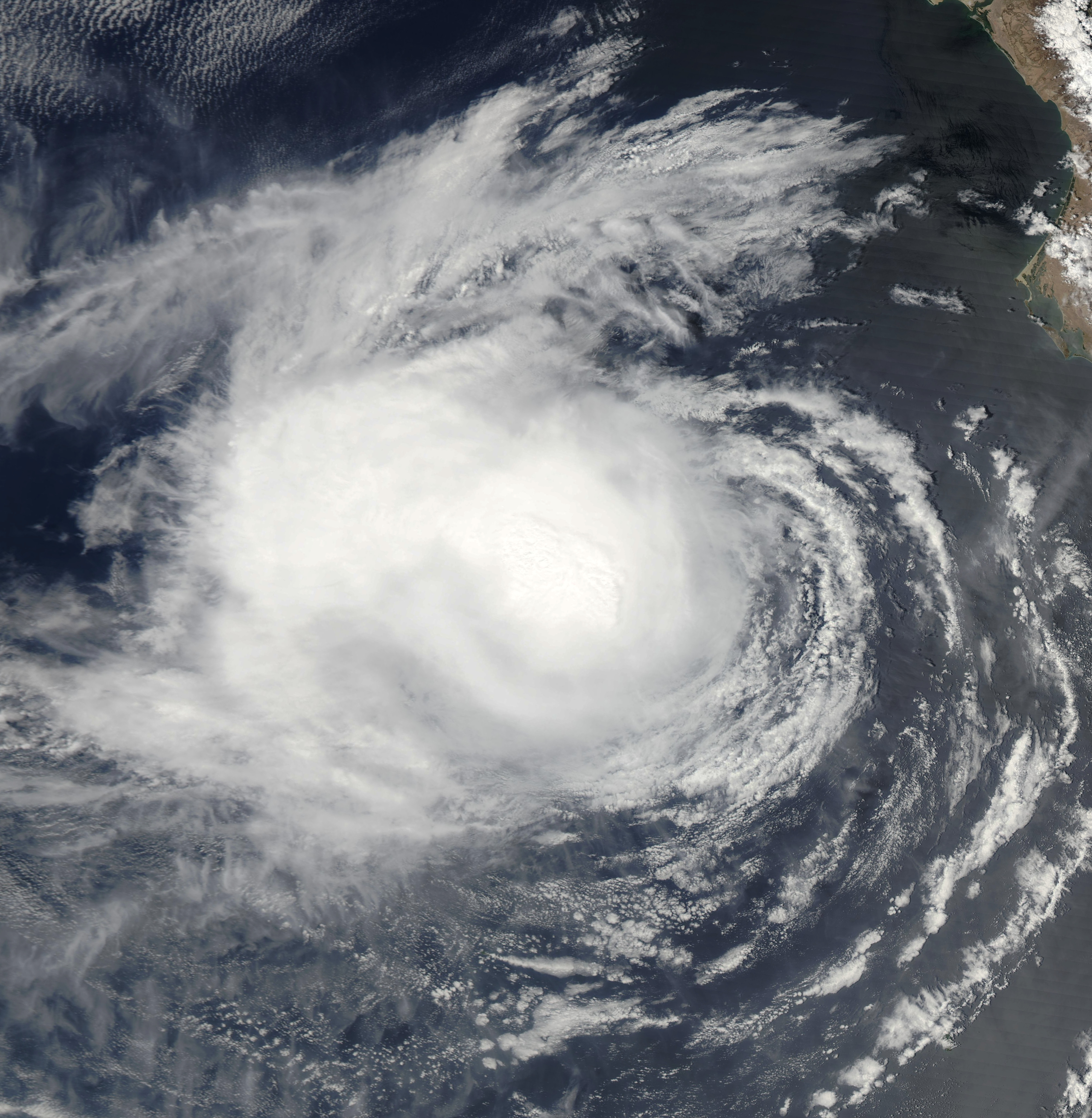
Satellite image of Tropical Storm Iselle near peak intensity on September 17

- 18:00 UTC (11:00 a.m. PDT) at 21.6°N 114.0°W – Tropical Storm Iselle reaches maximum sustained winds of 70 mph (110 km/h) and a minimum barometric pressure of 990 mbar (29.23 inHg) about 270 mi (435 km) west-southwest of Cabo San Lucas, Baja California Sur.

==== September 19 ====
- 18:00 UTC (11:00 a.m. PDT) at 23.8°N 112.5°W – Tropical Storm Iselle weakens into a tropical depression about 65 mi (100 km) southwest of Puerto Cortés, Baja California Sur.

==== September 20 ====
- 06:00 UTC (11:00 p.m. PDT, September 19) at 24.5°N 112.8°W – Tropical Depression Iselle degenerates into a remnant low about 65 mi (100 km) west of Puerto Cortés, Baja California Sur.

==== September 25 ====
- 00:00 UTC (5:00 p.m. PDT, September 24) at 14.6°N 101.8°W – A tropical depression forms from an area of unsettled weather about 200 mi (325 km) southwest of Acapulco, Guerrero.
- 12:00 UTC (5:00 a.m. PDT) at 16.1°N 101.6°W – The tropical depression strengthens into Tropical Storm Julio about 125 mi (205 km) west-southwest of Acapulco, Guerrero.
- 18:00 UTC (11:00 a.m. PDT) at 17.0°N 101.9°W – Tropical Storm Julio reaches maximum sustained winds of 45 mph (75 km/h) about 70 mi (110 km) south-southwest of Lázaro Cárdenas, Michoacán.

==== September 26 ====
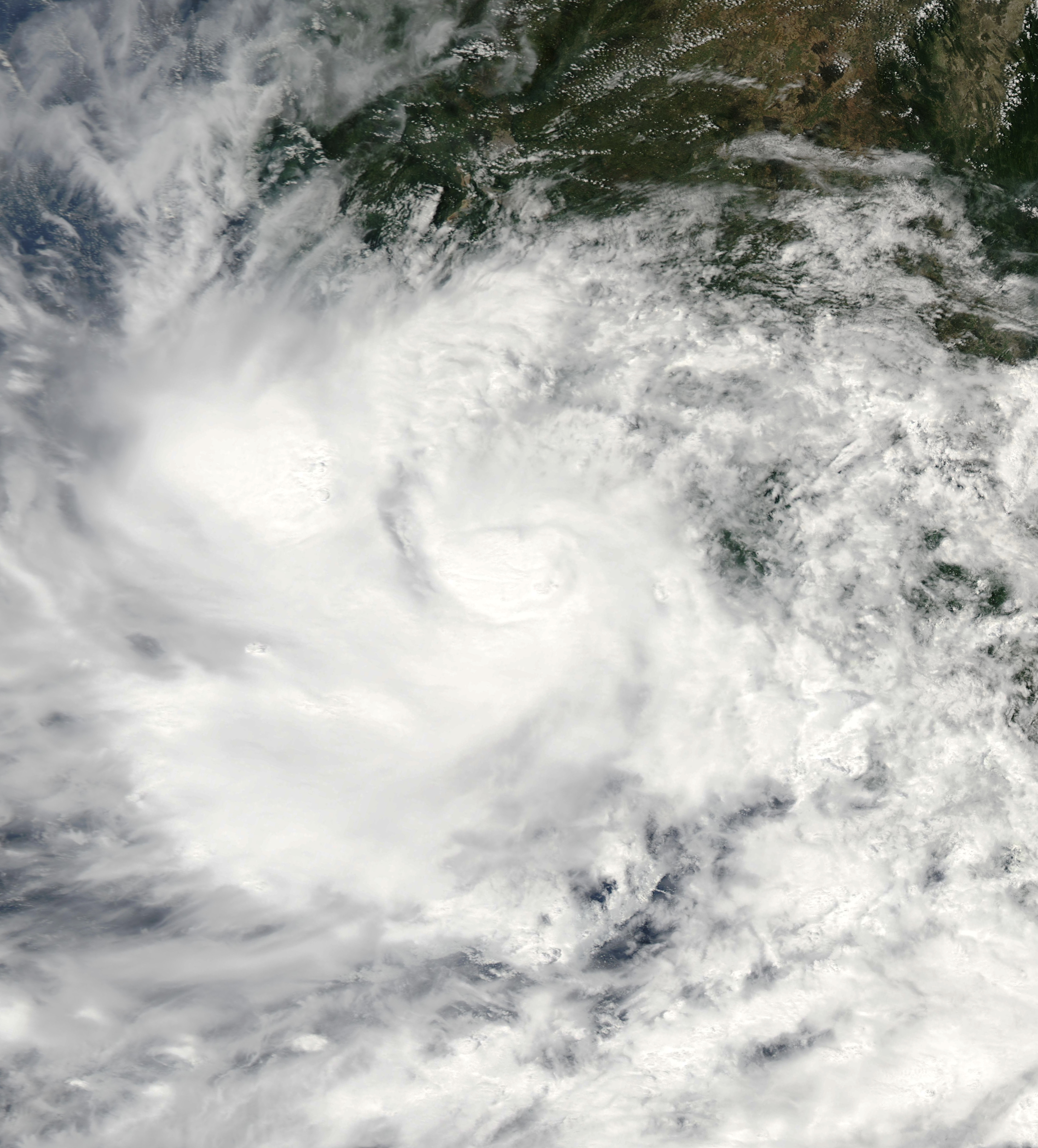
Satellite image of Tropical Storm Julio shortly before making landfall near peak intensity late on September 25

- 00:00 UTC (5:00 p.m. PDT, September 25) at 18.0°N 102.4°W – Tropical Storm Julio makes landfall a short distance west-northwest of Lázaro Cárdenas, Michoacán, with sustained winds of 45 mph (75 km/h); it simultaneously reaches a minimum barometric pressure of 1,000 mbar (29.53 inHg).
- 12:00 UTC (5:00 a.m. PDT) at 19.4°N 104.3°W – Tropical Storm Julio weakens into a tropical depression inland about 25 mi (35 km) north of Manzanillo, Colima; it dissipates six hours later while continuing northwestward.

=== October ===
==== October 22 ====
- 00:00 UTC (5:00 p.m. PDT, October 21) at 11.4°N 99.4°W – A tropical depression forms from an area of unsettled weather about 380 mi (610 km) south of Acapulco, Guerrero.
- 06:00 UTC (11:00 p.m. PDT, October 21) at 11.5°N 100.4°W – The aforementioned tropical depression strengthens into Tropical Storm Kenna about 375 mi (600 km) south of Acapulco, Guerrero.
- 18:00 UTC (11:00 a.m. PDT) at 11.0°N 130.5°W – Another tropical depression forms from an area of unsettled weather over the western part of the Eastern Pacific basin.

==== October 23 ====
- 06:00 UTC (11:00 p.m. PDT, October 22) at 11.8°N 130.5°W – The aforementioned tropical depression strengthens into Tropical Storm Lowell.
- 12:00 UTC (5:00 a.m. PDT) at 12.7°N 141.0°W – Tropical Storm Lowell reaches a minimum barometric pressure of 1,002 mbar (29.59 inHg) and initial peak sustained winds of 45 mph (75 km/h).
- 18:00 UTC (11:00 a.m. PDT) at 14.2°N 106.9°W – Tropical Storm Kenna strengthens into a Category 1 hurricane about 435 mi (705 km) south of Cabo Corrientes, Jalisco.
- 18:00 UTC (8:00 a.m. HST) at 8.7°N 153.8°W – Tropical Depression Three-C forms from an area of unsettled weather within a large monsoonal trough about 1,195 mi (1,925 km) east-southeast of Johnston Atoll. (Note: While HURDAT lists a formation time of 18:00 UTC on October 23 for Tropical Depression Three-C – which eventually became Hurricane Huko – the CPHC stated in their seasonal summary that the system did not develop until 24 hours later.)

==== October 24 ====
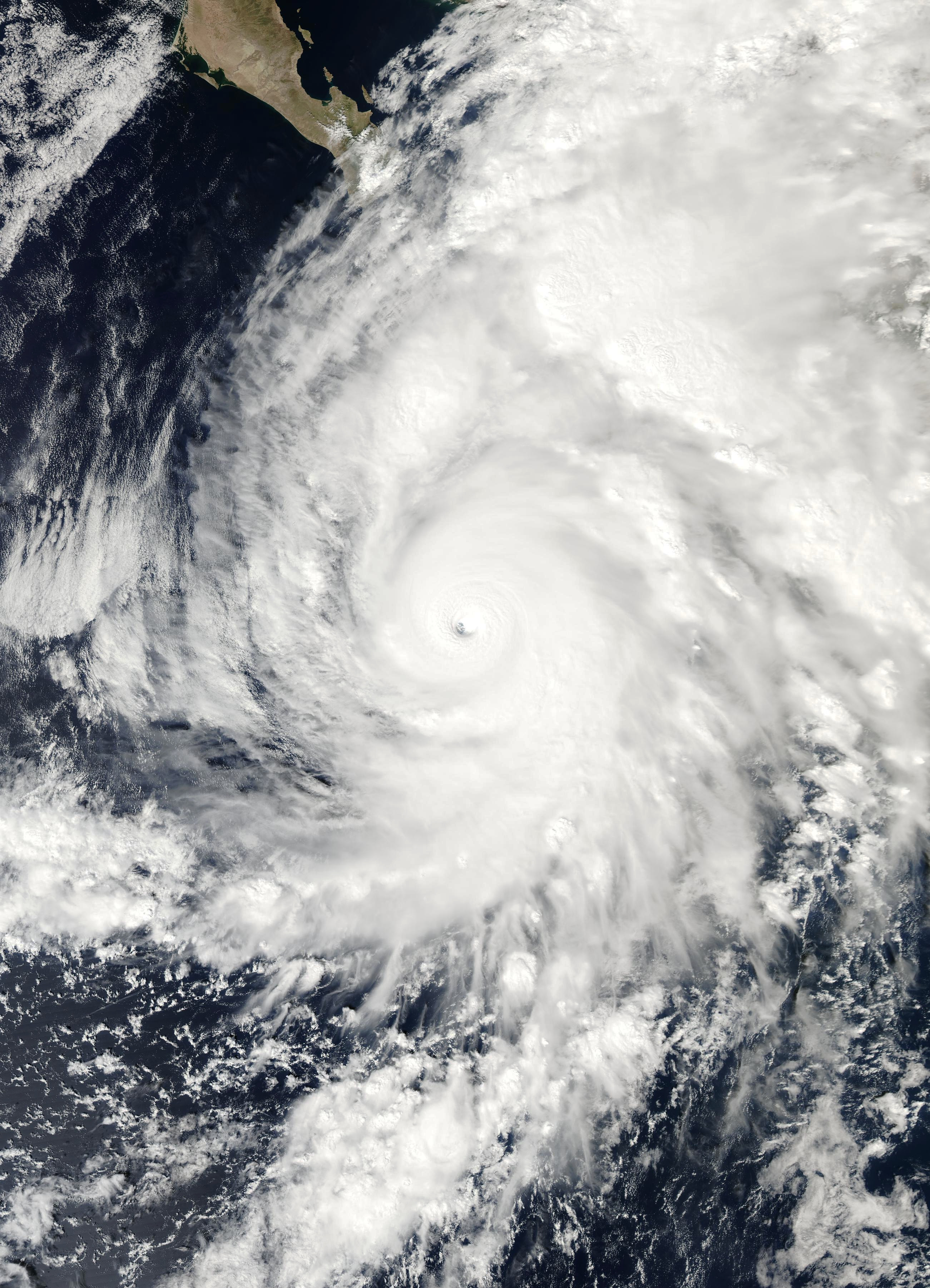
Satellite image of Hurricane Kenna reaching Category 5 strength on October 24

- 00:00 UTC (5:00 p.m. PDT, October 23) at 14.9°N 108.0°W – Hurricane Kenna strengthens to Category 2 intensity about 410 mi (660 km) south-southwest of Cabo Corrientes, Jalisco.
- 06:00 UTC (11:00 p.m. PDT, October 23) at 15.5°N 108.5°W – Hurricane Kenna strengthens to Category 3 intensity about 385 mi (620 km) south-southwest of Cabo Corrientes, Jalisco, making it the sixth and final major hurricane of the season.
- 12:00 UTC (5:00 a.m. PDT) at 16.4°N 108.8°W – Hurricane Kenna strengthens to Category 4 intensity about 345 mi (555 km) southwest of Cabo Corrientes, Jalisco.
- 18:00 UTC (11:00 a.m. PDT) at 17.3°N 108.8°W – Hurricane Kenna strengthens to Category 5 intensity about 295 mi (475 km) southwest of Cabo Corrientes, Jalisco, making it the record-tying third such storm this season.
- 18:00 UTC (11:00 a.m. PDT) at 12.3°N 135.5°W – Tropical Storm Lowell weakens into a tropical depression.

==== October 25 ====
- 00:00 UTC (5:00 p.m. PDT, October 24) at 18.3°N 108.3°W – Hurricane Kenna reaches maximum sustained winds of 165 mph (270 km/h) and a minimum barometric pressure of 913 mbar (26.96 inHg) about 225 mi (360 km) southwest of Cabo Corrientes, Jalisco, making it the strongest storm of the season.
- 12:00 UTC (5:00 a.m. PDT) at 20.4°N 106.5°W – Hurricane Kenna weakens to Category 4 intensity about 50 mi (85 km) west of Cabo Corrientes, Jalisco.

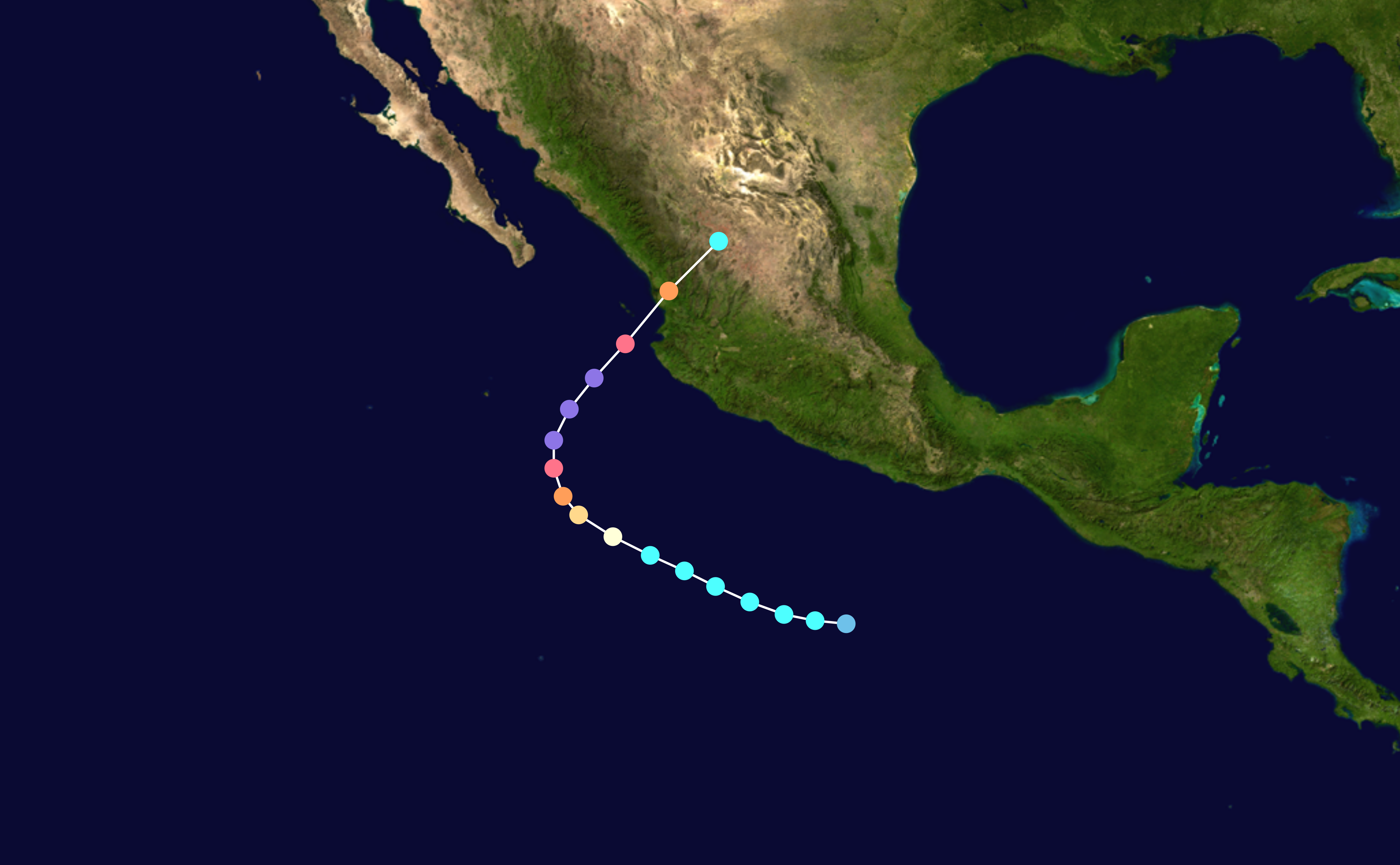
Storm path of Hurricane Kenna

- 16:30 UTC (9:30 a.m. PDT) at 21.7°N 105.4°W – Hurricane Kenna makes landfall near San Blas, Nayarit, with sustained winds of 140 mph (220 km/h) and a barometric pressure of 950 mbar (28.05 inHg).
- 18:00 UTC (11:00 a.m. PDT) at 22.1°N 105.1°W – Hurricane Kenna weakens to Category 3 intensity inland about 40 mi (65 km) north-northeast of San Blas, Nayarit.

==== October 26 ====
- 00:00 UTC (5:00 p.m. PDT, October 25) at 23.7°N 103.5°W – Hurricane Kenna drastically weakens into a tropical storm, skipping both Category 2 and Category 1 status, inland about 190 mi (305 km) northeast of San Blas, Nayarit; it dissipates six hours later.
- 00:00 UTC (2:00 p.m. HST, October 25) at 12.7°N 140.5°W – Tropical Depression Lowell crosses into the Central Pacific basin.
- 00:00 UTC (2:00 p.m. HST, October 25) at 10.8°N 154.9°W – Tropical Depression Three-C strengthens into Tropical Storm Huko about 1,065 mi (1,715 km) east-southeast of Johnston Atoll.

==== October 27 ====
- 18:00 UTC (8:00 a.m. HST) at 12.8°N 144.1°W – Tropical Depression Lowell restrengthens into a tropical storm.

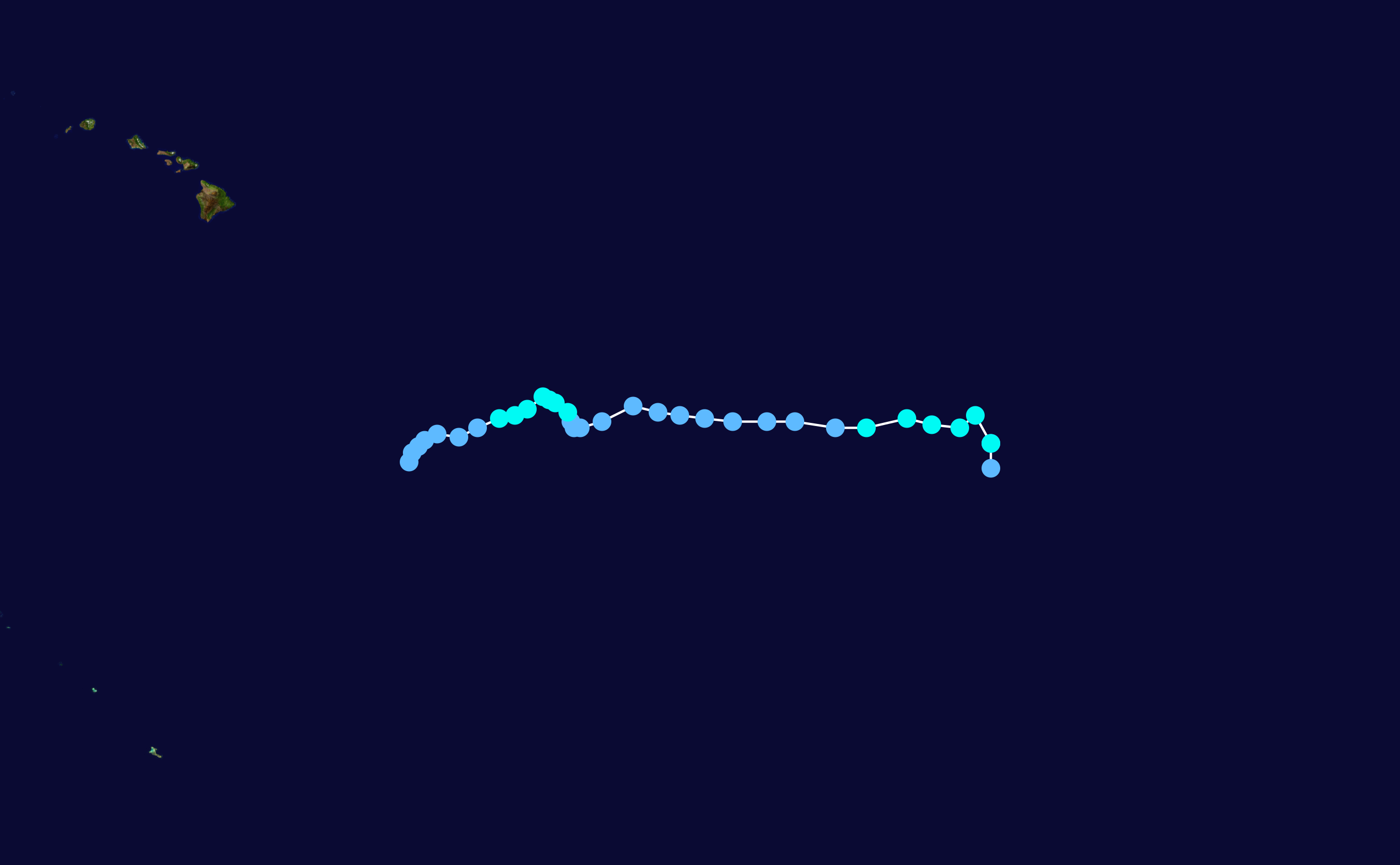
Storm path of Tropical Storm Lowell

==== October 28 ====
- 12:00 UTC (2:00 a.m. HST) at 13.3°N 144.9°W – Tropical Storm Lowell reaches maximum sustained winds of 50 mph (85 km/h) and reattains its minimum barometric pressure of 1,002 mbar (29.59 inHg).
- 18:00 UTC (8:00 a.m. HST) at 12.8°N 159.4°W – Tropical Storm Huko strengthens into a Category 1 hurricane about 730 mi (1,175 km) east-southeast of Johnston Atoll; it simultaneously reaches its initial peak intensity with sustained winds of 75 mph (120 km/h) and a barometric pressure of 987 mbar (29.15 inHg).

==== October 29 ====
- 12:00 UTC (2:00 a.m. HST) at 12.3°N 147.0°W – Tropical Storm Lowell weakens back into a tropical depression.

==== October 30 ====
- 00:00 UTC (2:00 p.m. HST, October 29) at 14.0°N 161.3°W – Hurricane Huko weakens into a tropical storm about 580 mi (935 km) east-southeast of Johnston Atoll.
- 06:00 UTC (8:00 p.m. HST, October 29) at 34.4°N 178.3°W – The JMA reports that Tropical Storm Maysak has crossed the International Date Line and entered the Central Pacific basin while still a tropical storm. Around this time or shortly thereafter, the JMA declares that the system has transitioned into an extratropical cyclone.

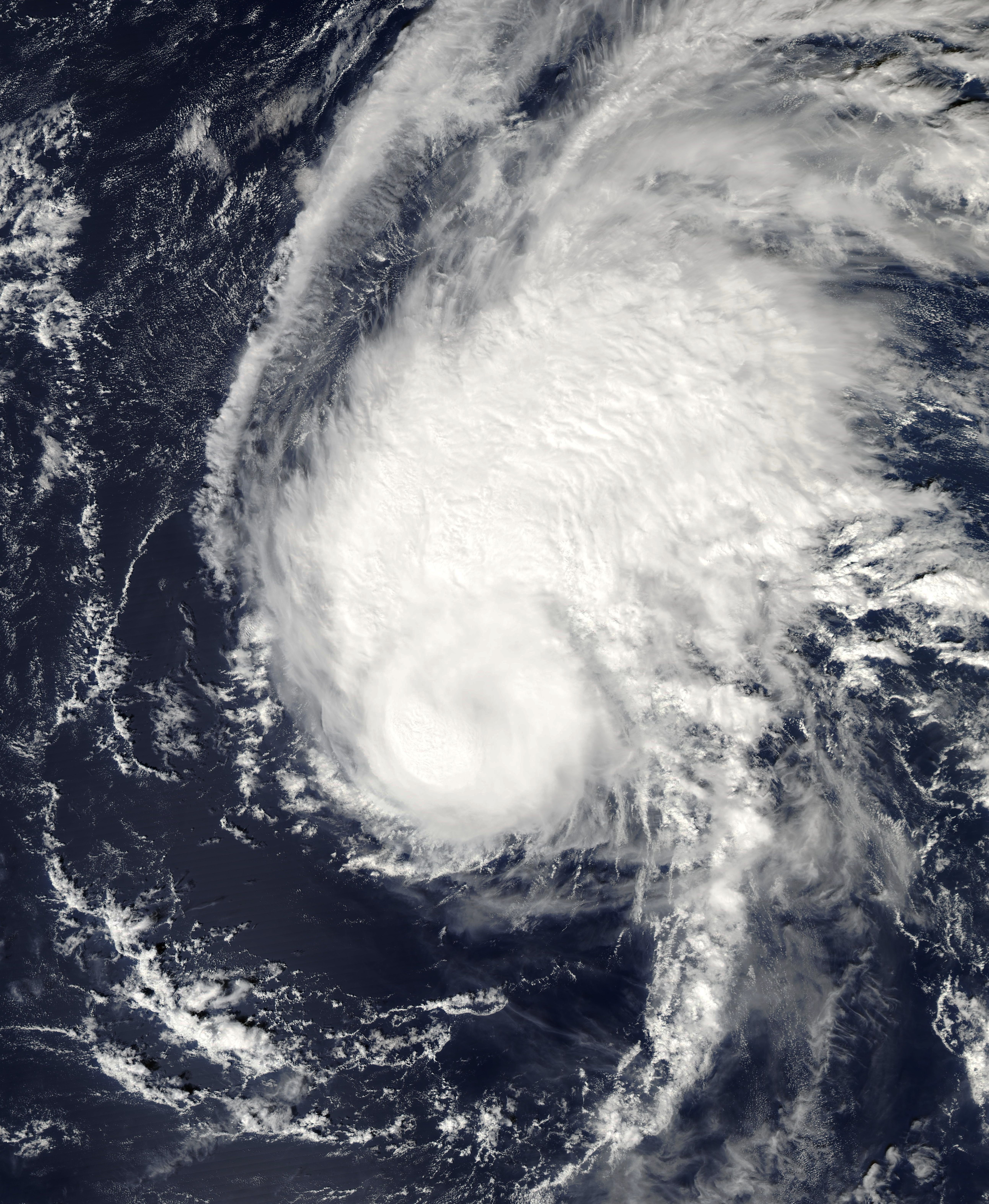
Satellite image of Hurricane Huko early on November 3

==== October 31 ====
- 00:00 UTC (2:00 p.m. HST, October 30) at 11.2°N 149.2°W – Tropical Depression Lowell is last noted as a tropical cyclone; it dissipates a short time later.
- 06:00 UTC (8:00 p.m. HST, October 30) at 13.8°N 166.2°W – Tropical Storm Huko reattains Category 1 hurricane strength about 300 mi (480 km) southeast of Johnston Atoll.

=== November ===
==== November 1 ====
- 12:00 UTC (2:00 a.m. HST) at 14.1°N 171.4°W – Hurricane Huko reaches maximum sustained winds of 85 mph (140 km/h) about 220 mi (350 km) southwest of Johnston Atoll.
- 18:00 UTC (8:00 a.m. HST) at 14.6°N 172.0°W – Hurricane Huko reaches a minimum barometric pressure of 980 mbar (28.94 inHg) about 220 mi (350 km) southwest of Johnston Atoll.

==== November 3 ====
- 12:00 UTC (2:00 a.m. HST) at 15.7°N 179.8°E – Hurricane Huko crosses the International Date Line, becoming Typhoon Huko in the Western Pacific basin. (Note: Both HURDAT and the CPHC's year-end report on tropical cyclone activity in the Central Pacific list 15.7°N 179.1°W as Huko's final position east of the International Date Line without providing any best track data on the storm's tenure in the Western Pacific basin. The JTWC and the International Best Track Archive for Climate Stewardship disagree with this assessment, listing Huko's final position east of the International Date Line as 15.5°N 178.6°W; they also contradict the former two sources by providing a best track for Huko in the Western Pacific basin.)

==== November 14 ====
- 00:00 UTC (4:00 p.m. PST, (Note: On October 27, daylight saving time ended in most areas of the basin, which resulted in the gap between UTC and local time widening by one hour. Hawaii was not affected; the state has not observed daylight saving time since 1945.) November 13) at 15.1°N 109.9°W – Tropical Depression Sixteen-E forms about 540 mi (870 km) south of the southern tip of the Baja California peninsula.

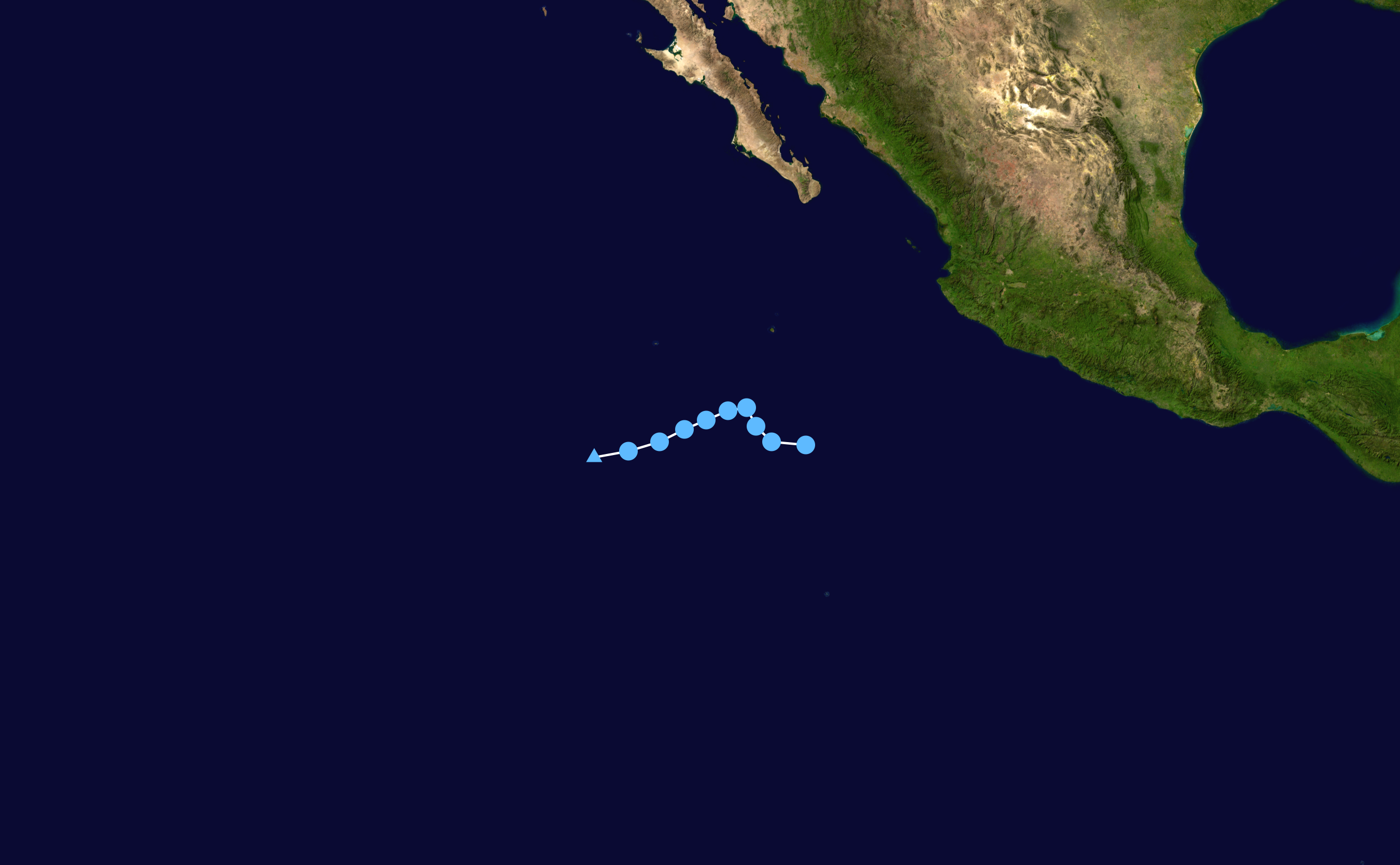
Storm path of Tropical Depression Sixteen-E

- 06:00 UTC (10:00 p.m. PST, November 13) at 15.2°N 111.0°W – Tropical Depression Sixteen-E reaches maximum sustained winds of 35 mph (55 km/h) about 535 mi (860 km) south of the southern tip of the Baja California peninsula.

==== November 15 ====
- 12:00 UTC (4:00 a.m. PST) at 15.6°N 113.8°W – Tropical Depression Sixteen-E reaches a minimum barometric pressure of 1,006 mbar (29.71 inHg) about 565 mi (910 km) south-southwest of the southern tip of the Baja California peninsula.

==== November 16 ====
- 06:00 UTC (10:00 p.m. PST, November 15) at 14.7°N 116.7°W – Tropical Depression Sixteen-E degenerates into a remnant low about 715 mi (1,150 km) southwest of the southern tip of the Baja California peninsula.

==== November 30 ====
- The 2002 Pacific hurricane season officially ends.

== See also ==
- Timeline of the 2002 Atlantic hurricane season
- List of Pacific hurricanes
- Pacific hurricane season
- Tropical cyclones in 2002
