= 1983 Pacific hurricane season =

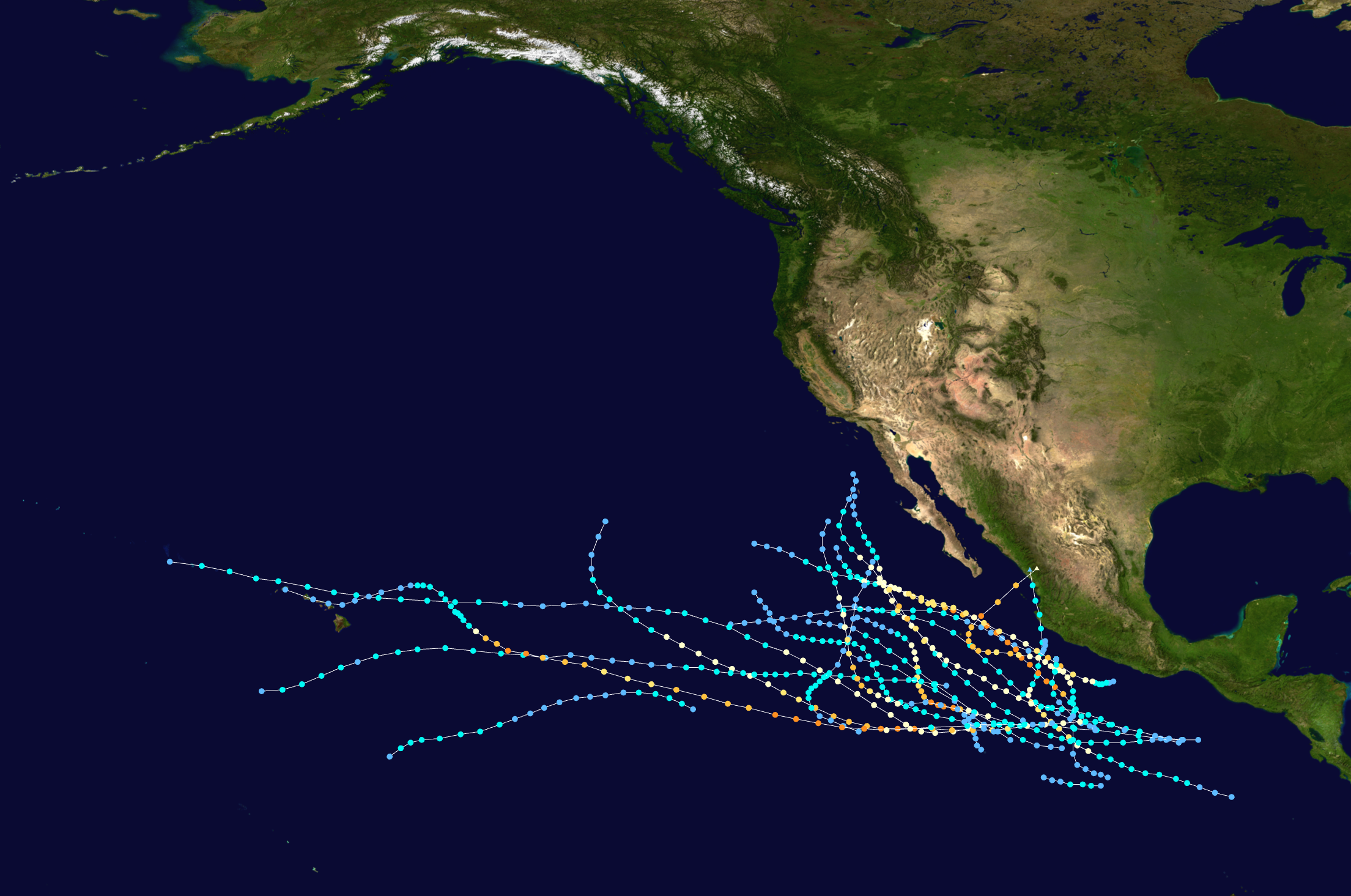
- Season summary map

Seasonal boundaries
- First system formed: May 21, 1983
- Last system dissipated: December 7, 1983

Strongest storm
- Name: Kiko and Raymond
  - Maximum winds: 145 mph (230 km/h) (1-minute sustained)

Seasonal statistics
- Total depressions: 26
- Total storms: 21
- Hurricanes: 12
- Major hurricanes (Cat. 3+): 8
- Total fatalities: 168 total
- Total damage: $816.33 million (1983 USD)

Related articles
- 1983 Atlantic hurricane season; 1983 Pacific typhoon season; 1983 North Indian Ocean cyclone season

The 1983 Pacific hurricane season was an above average Pacific hurricane season which became the longest season ever recorded at the time. The season began on May 15, 1983 in the eastern Pacific, and on June 1, 1983 in the central Pacific, and ended on November 30, 1983. These dates conventionally delimit the period of each year when most tropical cyclones form in the northeastern Pacific Ocean. During the 1983 season, there were 20 named storms, which was slightly less than the previous season. Furthermore, twelve storms strengthened into hurricanes while eight reached major hurricane status, Category 3 or higher on the Saffir–Simpson hurricane wind scale (SSHWS). The decaying 1982–83 El Niño event likely contributed to a high level of activity. That same El Niño influenced a very quiet Atlantic hurricane season.

The first storm of the season, Hurricane Adolph, became the southernmost-forming east Pacific tropical cyclone on record after forming at a latitude of 7.1°N. After a slow start, activity picked up in July, when Hurricane Gil moved through the Hawaiian Islands, resulting in minor damage. In early August, Hurricane Ismael was responsible for three deaths and $19 million (1983 USD) in damage in the United States. In September, hurricanes Kiko and Lorena brought significant damage and seven deaths to southern Mexico. About a month later, Tropical Storm Octave became the worst tropical cyclone on record to affect Arizona. Octave killed 15 people, and caused $500 million in damage to Arizona and $12.5 million to New Mexico. Later in October, Hurricane Tico was a very intense hurricane at the time of its landfall and thus left 25,000 homeless. Damage throughout the country was estimated at $200 million while 135 deaths were reported in Mexico. Although the majority of its impact occurred in Mexico, Tico's remnants brought significant flooding in the Central United States, resulting in six deaths and $42 million in damage. A few days later, Hurricane Raymond posed a threat to Hawaii, but sustained minimal damage. The final storm of the season, Hurricane Winnie, was a rare December cyclone.

== Seasonal summary ==
Most intense Pacific hurricane seasons
Rank	Season	ACE value
1	2026	359.5
2	2018	318.1
3	1992	294.6
4	2015	290.6
5	1990	249.5
6	1978	207.7
7	1983	206.2
8	2014	202.4
9	1993	201.8
10	1984	193.7

During the 1983 season, a total of 21 named storms formed, which was well-above the long-term average of 15. However, this total was slightly less active than the 1982 Pacific hurricane season, which saw a then-record 22 storms form. However, 1983 was at that time the most active season in the Eastern Pacific Hurricane Center (EPHC) warning zone, but this record itself was surpassed during the 1985 Pacific hurricane season, and again in the 1992 Pacific hurricane season. Additionally, 12 storms reached hurricane intensity, which was above the average of eight. Of the 12 hurricanes, eight attained Category 3 intensity or higher on the SSHWS. The season started on May 21 with the formation of Adolph and ended on December 9, with the dissipation of Hurricane Winnie. Lasting 201 days, 1983 was the longest season on record. There were a total of 1,238 storm hours, which was the most in four years. Despite the activity in the EPHC's warning responsibility, only two storms formed in the Central Pacific Hurricane Center (CPHC)'s area of responsibility, both of which stayed depressions. A moderate El Niño was present throughout the season, with water temperatures across the equatorial Central Pacific was nearly 5 °F (0.6 °C) above normal. The Pacific decadal oscillation (PDO) was in a warm phase during this time period. Both of these factors are known to enhance Pacific hurricane season activity. Furthermore, 1983 was in the middle of an era where all but the 1988 Pacific hurricane season was near or above average.

One storm in 1983 formed in May, an event the occurs every other year on average. Another storm formed in June, which was below the average of 1.7 storms per June. Despite a somewhat slow start, activity picked up in July, where 6 storms formed. This was twice the average, though only two of the storms thus far had exceeded hurricane intensity. Although August was less active, with only 3 storms developing, compared to the average of 4, two of the storms that formed in July lasted into the early part of the month. However, activity picked back up again in September, with 5 storms forming, which was above the average of 3. Three storms also formed in October, which was two storms above normal. One storm developed in November as well, a somewhat unusual occurrence. For the first time since 1947, a hurricane developed in December.

Three storms during the season made landfall on Mexico. The first, Adolph did so in May. The second, Tico, hit near Mazatlán as a powerful hurricane, resulting in severe damage. Around this time, a weak tropical depression made landfall along the western portion of the nation as well. In addition, Tropical Depression Raymond made landfall on Hawaii in late October. Hurricane Hunters flew into 2 storms within the EPHC zone, Manuel and Ismael. Moreover, they flew into 3 storms in CPHC's area of responsibility, Tropical Storms Gil and Narda, and Hurricane Raymond.

== Systems ==
=== Hurricane Adolph ===
- Category 2 hurricane (SSHWS)
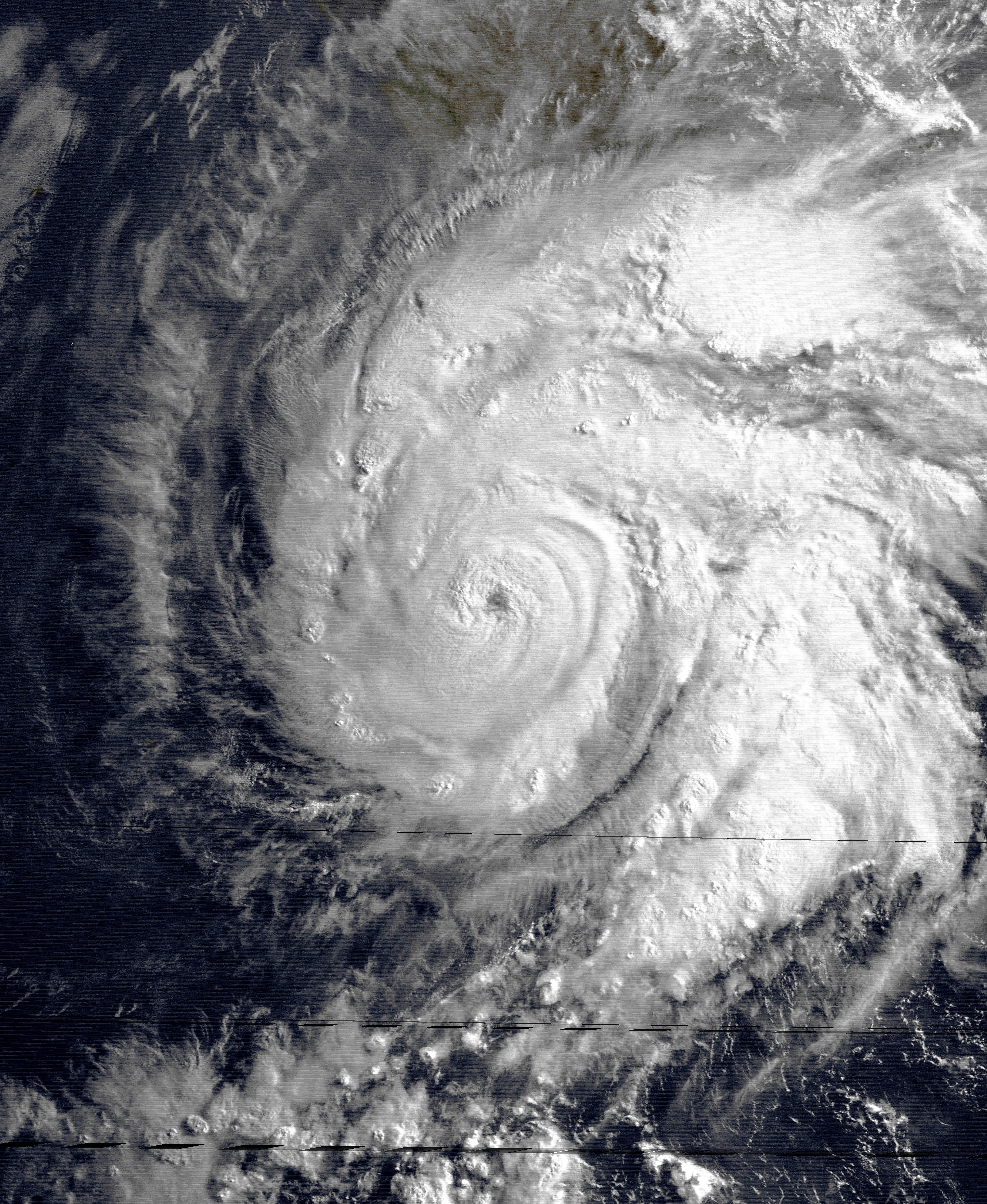
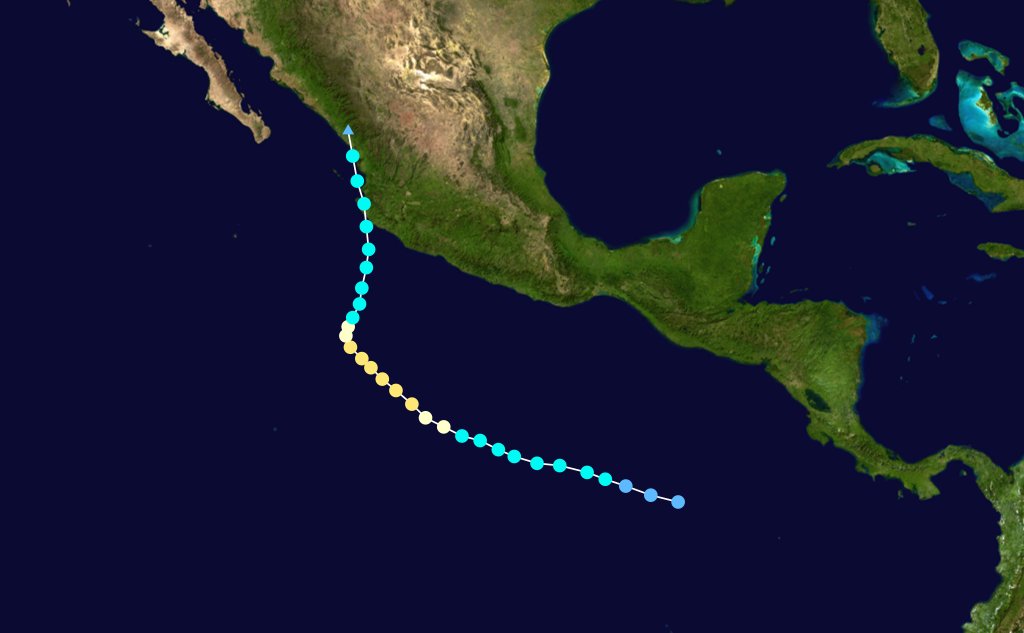
- Duration: May 21 – May 28
- Peak intensity: 110 mph (175 km/h) (1-min);

On May 21, a tropical depression formed 500 mi (805 km) southwest of Managua, at a latitude of 7.1°N, becoming the southernmost-forming tropical cyclone in the east Pacific basin. As the depression headed gradually west-northwestward over extremely warm sea surface temperatures, it steadily intensified. Later that day, the depression intensified into Tropical Storm Adolph. Further intensification occurred as Adolph headed west-northwestward; by May 24, the EPHC reported that Adolph had strengthened into a hurricane, setting a then-record for the earliest known hurricane in the basin, though this was later surpassed by Hurricane Alma in May 1990. Shortly thereafter, the storm turned northwestward and intensified into a Category 2 hurricane on the SSHWS. Around that time, Adolph attained its peak intensity with winds of 110 mph (175 km/h). At that time, Adolph was the strongest May hurricane on record. However, this record was broken by a hurricane of the same name in 2001.

Following peak intensity, Adolph gradually weakened to a Category 1 hurricane. By May 25, Adolph curved sharply north-northeastward, as a result of being steered by anticyclonic deep-layer mean. Despite being situated over fairly warm waters, Adolph weakened considerably due to increased wind shear. Although the EPHC expected the storm to stay at sea, Adolph curved north-northeastward. It was then downgraded to a tropical storm on May 25. Rapidly weakening, Tropical Storm Adolph moved onshore near Puerto Vallarta early the next day. After briefly moving offshore, it again made landfall near Mazatlán at 0800 UTC that day. Adolph soon dissipated over land, becoming the first of two storms to strike the Pacific coast of Mexico during the season. Because Hurricane Adolph weakened significantly prior to landfall, no deaths or major damage occurred. However, the remnants of the storm brought heavy showers and gusty winds to Florida. Although a modern Pacific hurricane season begins May 15, one newspaper considered Adolph a "pre-season" storm.

=== Hurricane Barbara ===
- Category 4 hurricane (SSHWS)
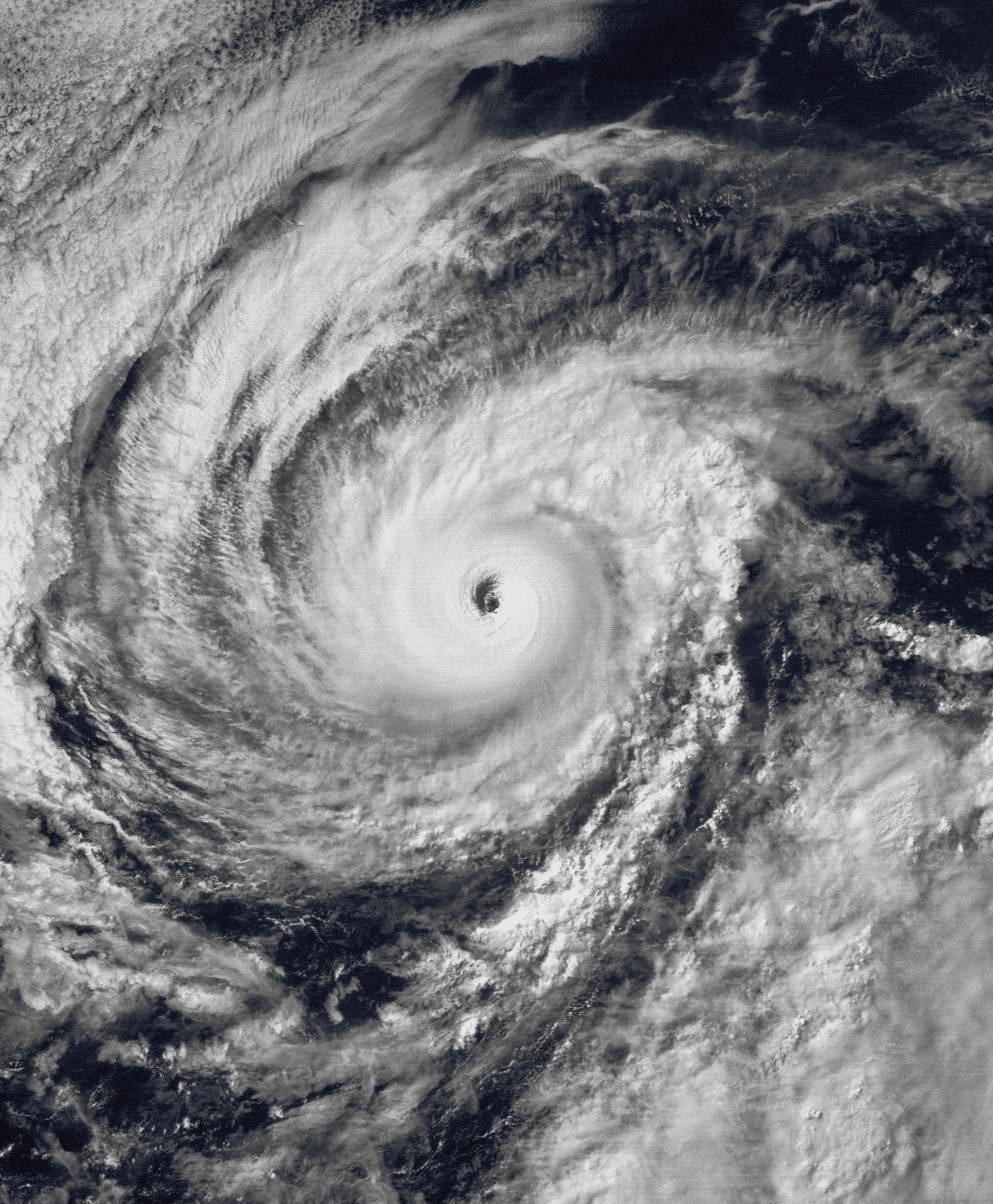
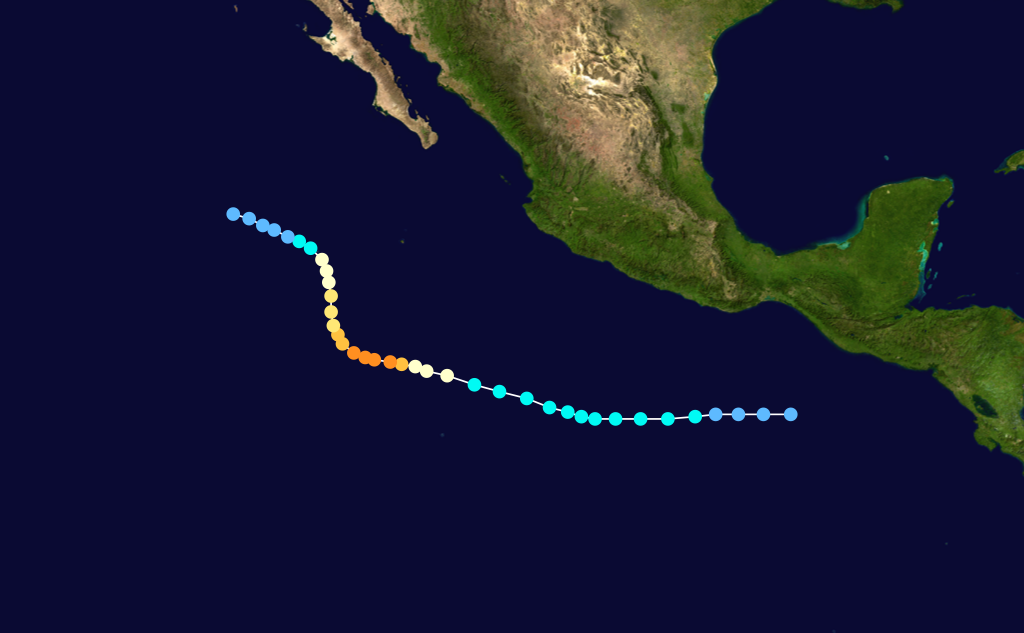
- Duration: June 9 – June 18
- Peak intensity: 130 mph (215 km/h) (1-min);

A tropical disturbance was first observed in early June about 210 mi (340 km) south of Guatemala, and headed westward. The tropical disturbance intensified, and became the second tropical depression of the season on June 9. After staying a tropical depression for 24 hours, the system was subsequently upgraded to Tropical Storm Barbara. Initially, Barbara was expected to come very close to the Mexican coast; however, this failed to happen. At first, Tropical Storm Barbara moved west-northwest, though on June 11, the cyclone turned west-northwest while gradually gaining intensity. At 1800 UTC on June 12, Barbara was estimated to have attained hurricane status while centered 175 mi (280 km) north of Clipperton Island. Shortly after becoming a hurricane, rapid deepening commenced, and by early the next morning, the hurricane was a high-end Category 1. Six hours later, Barbara skipped Category 2 status, and became a major hurricane. At 1800 UTC on June 13, Hurricane Barbara was upgraded into a category 4 hurricane on the SSHWS, with a peak strength of 130 mph (215 km/h).

Hurricane Barbara held on to peak intensity for a day. Thereafter, Barbara slowly weakened after peak intensity as it began to encounter cooler water temperatures, while moving slowly northward around the western edge of a high pressure area over central Mexico. By the early morning hours of June 16, the hurricane was positioned 380 km (235 mi) west-southwest of Socorro Island and about 500 mi (805 km) west of the coast of Mexico. Later that day, Barbara weakened into a tropical storm due to strong wind shear. Barbara was downgraded to a tropical depression early on June 17. Further weakening persisted, and Barbara dissipated on June 18. At the time of dissipation, the system was situated several hundred miles west-southwest of the Baja California peninsula.

=== Tropical Storm Cosme ===
- Tropical storm (SSHWS)
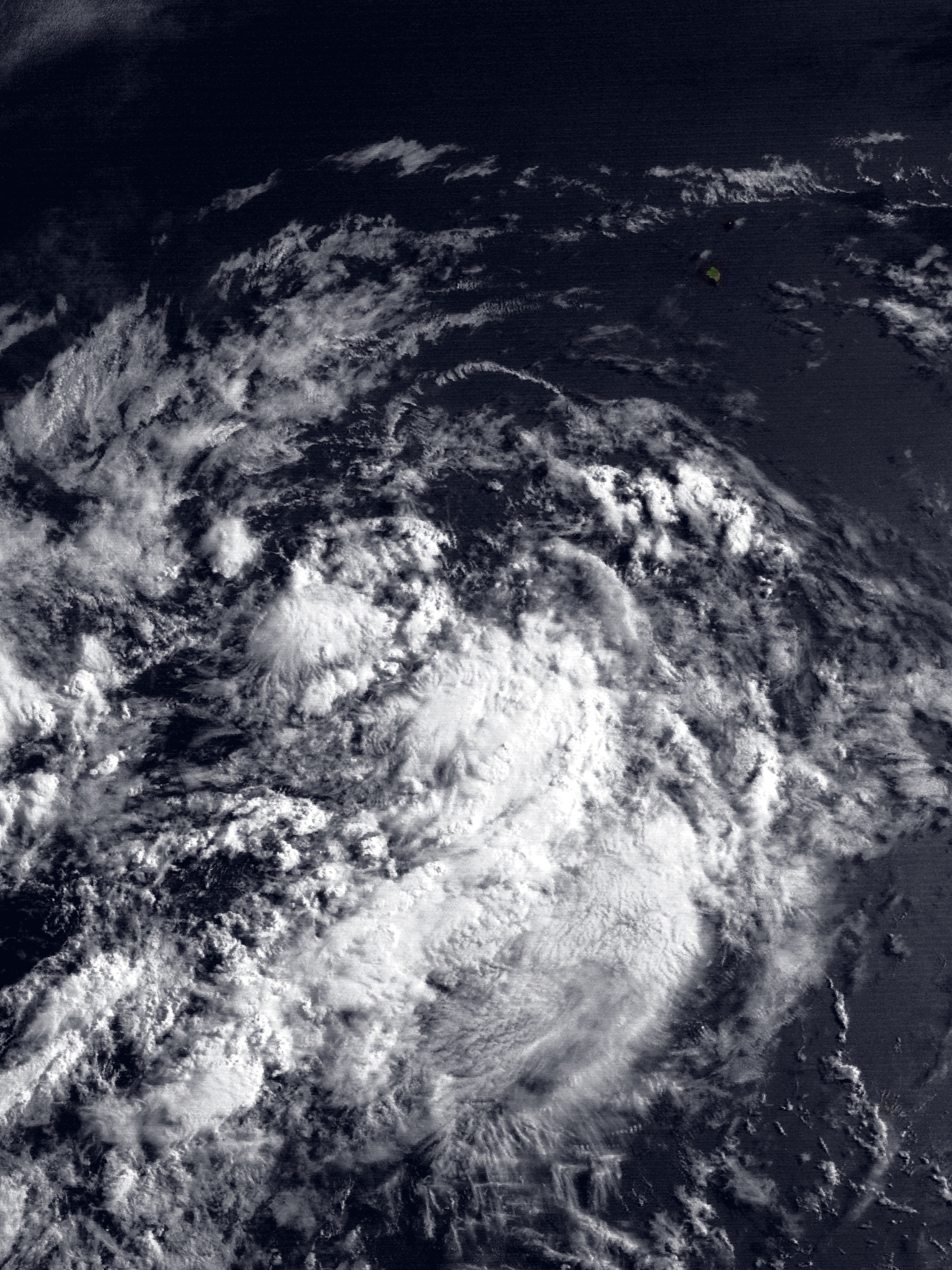
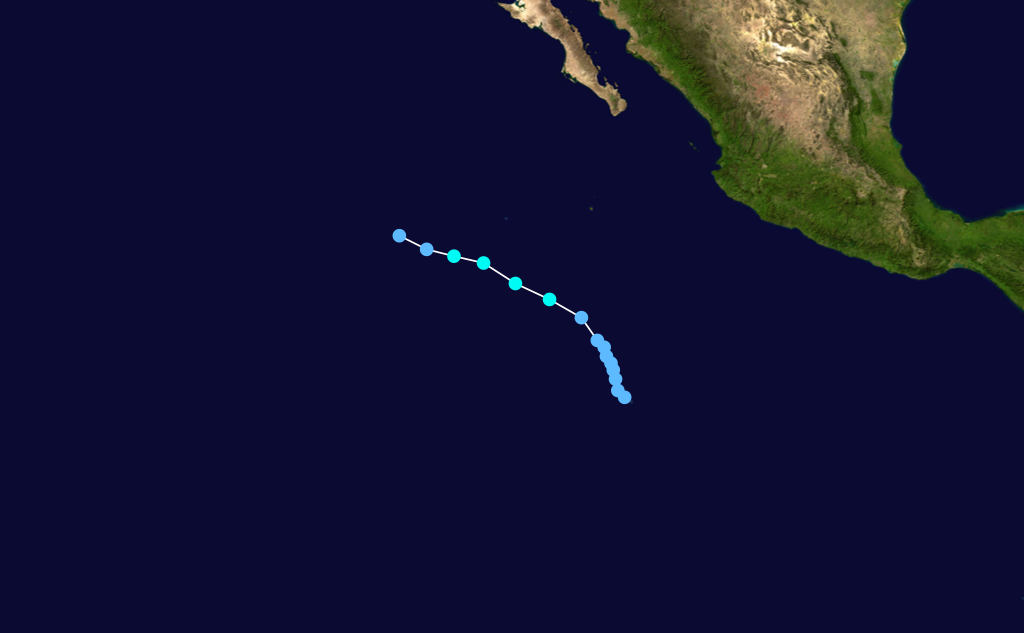
- Duration: July 2 – July 5
- Peak intensity: 40 mph (65 km/h) (1-min);

A westward-moving low-latitude tropical disturbance was declared a tropical depression early on July 2. After making a turn northwest, the depression maintained its intensity for 42 hours. By 1200 UTC on July 4, the system was finally upgraded into a tropical storm after convection increased in coverage. However, Cosme failed to intensify further, and after encountering cooler waters, the storm rapidly dissipated. The EPHC declared Cosme dissipated at 1800 UTC on July 5.

=== Tropical Storm Dalilia ===
- Tropical storm (SSHWS)
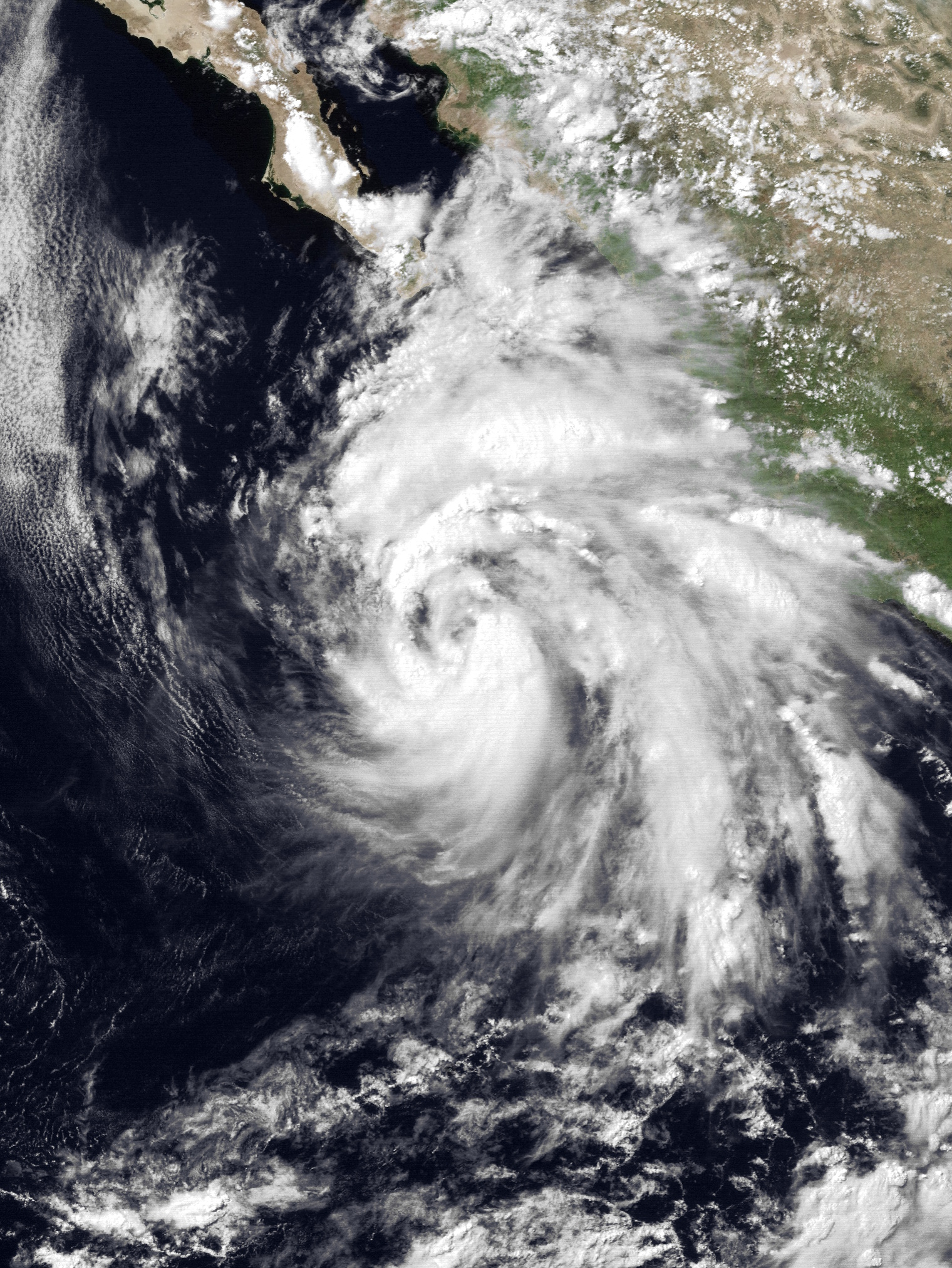
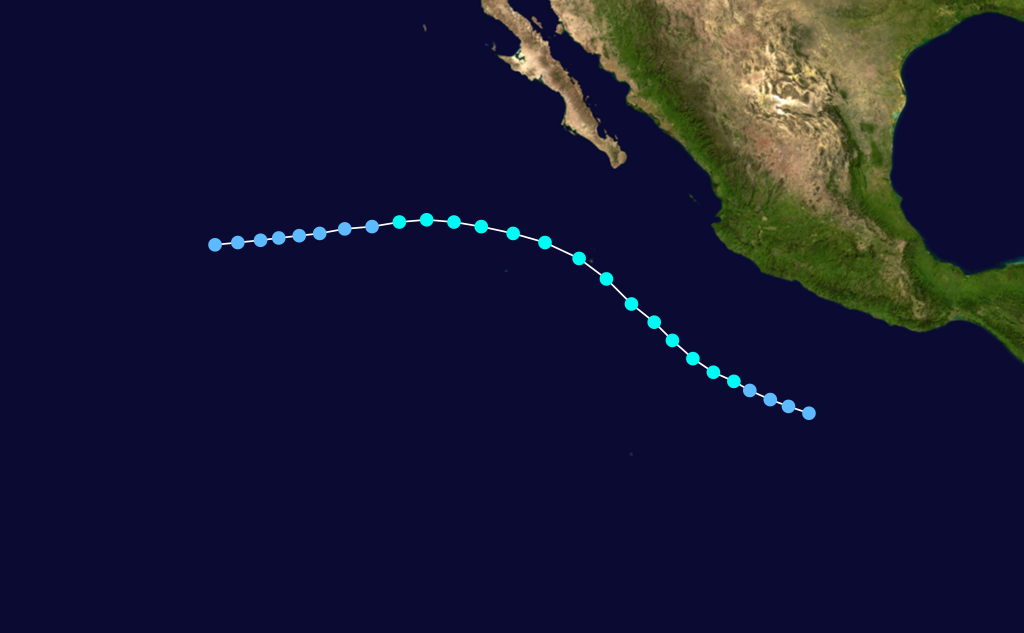
- Duration: July 5 – July 12
- Peak intensity: 70 mph (110 km/h) (1-min);

An intense area of thunderstorms developed 230 mi (370 km) south of the Gulf of Tehuantepec on July 4. The system was first classified as a tropical depression at 1800 UTC on July 5 roughly 345 mi (555 km) south-southeast of Acapulco. Turning west-northwest and then northwest while accelerating, the EPHC upgraded the depression into Tropical Storm Dalilia at 1800 UTC on July 6. Continuing to gain strength, Dalilia reached its peak intensity as a strong tropical storm early on July 8. After turning west the tropical storm started to lose strength while encountering colder water. At 0600 UTC on July 10, Tropical Storm Dalilia had been downgraded into a tropical depression. Two days later, the EPHC reported that the tropical cyclone had dissipated.

=== Tropical Storm Erick ===
- Tropical storm (SSHWS)
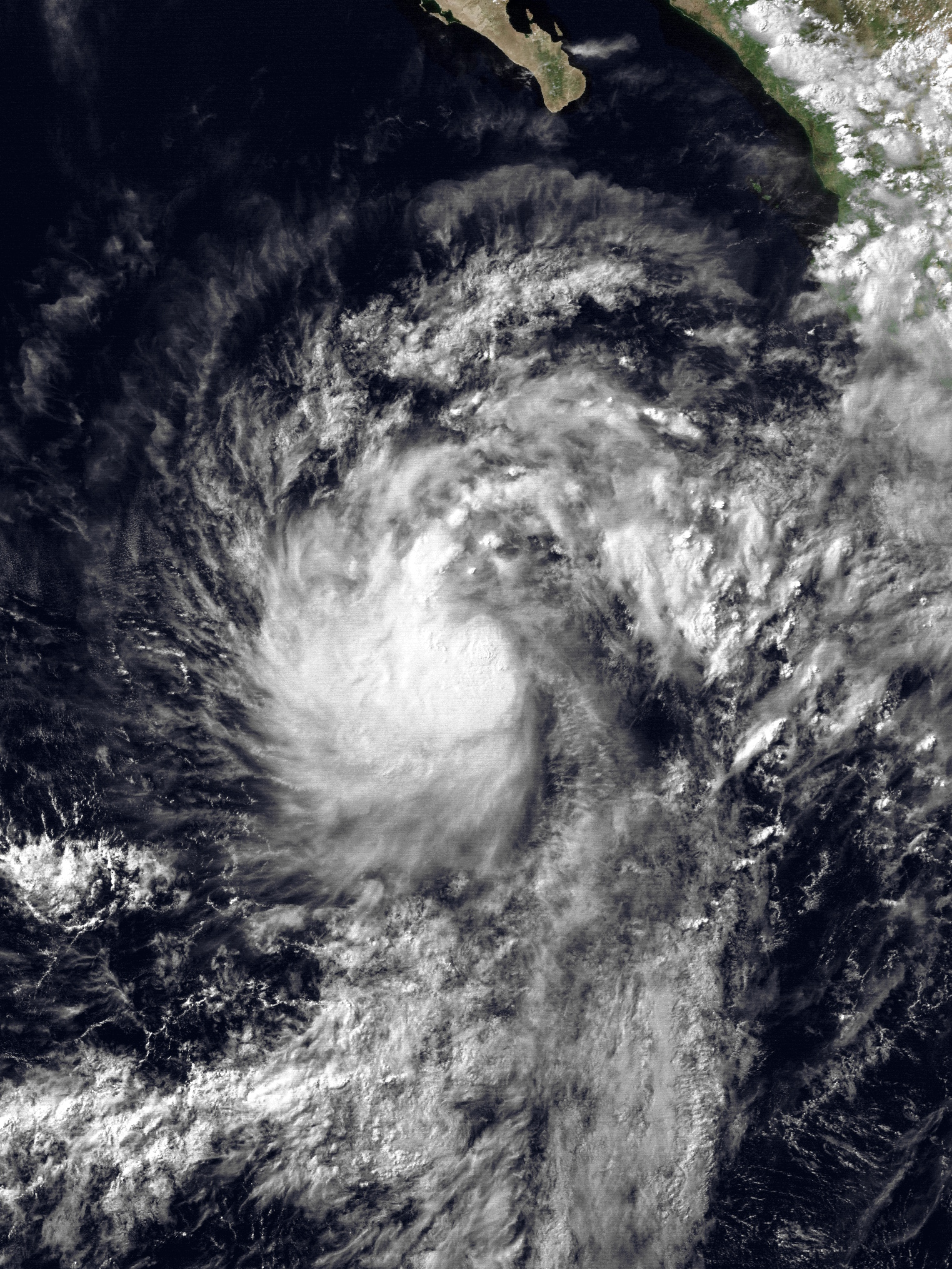
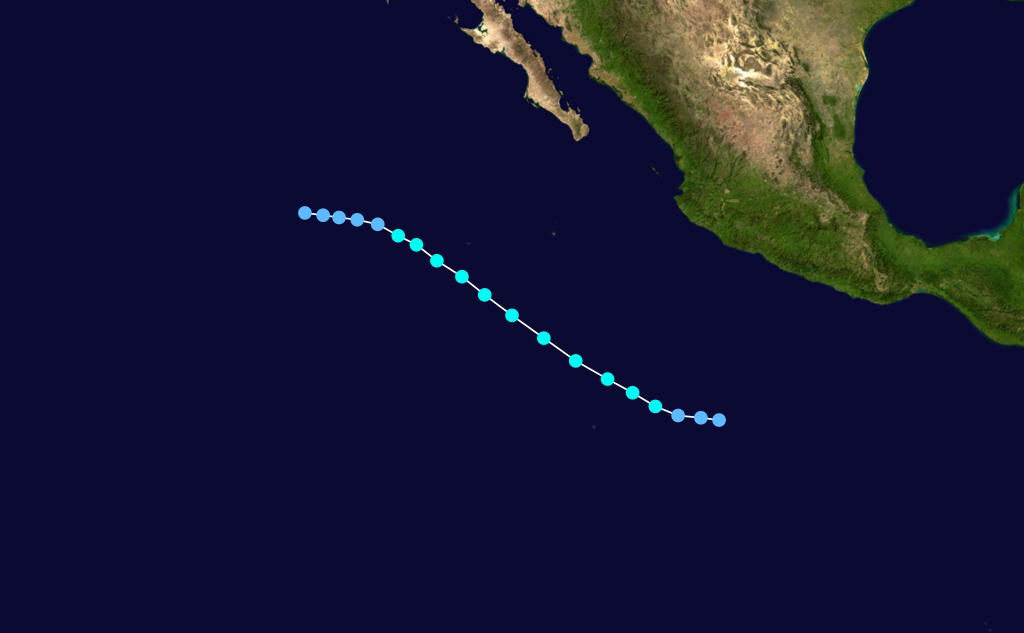
- Duration: July 12 – July 16
- Peak intensity: 65 mph (100 km/h) (1-min);

Tropical Storm Erick originated from a tropical wave that crossed Central America on July 9 and July 10. At 0600 UTC on July 12, the EPHC reported that it had upgraded the disturbance into a tropical depression. The depression moved steadily west-northwest under the influence of an anticyclone over the Yucatán Peninsula. The system gradually intensified over waters as warm as 86 °F (30 °C) and at 0000 UTC on July 13, the agency upgraded the low into a tropical storm. Tropical Storm Erick reached its peak intensity on July 14 as a high-end tropical storm. The storm maintained peak intensity for 24 hours, before encountering cooler water. Rapidly weakening, Erick dissipated on July 16 far from land.

=== Tropical Storm Flossie ===
- Tropical storm (SSHWS)
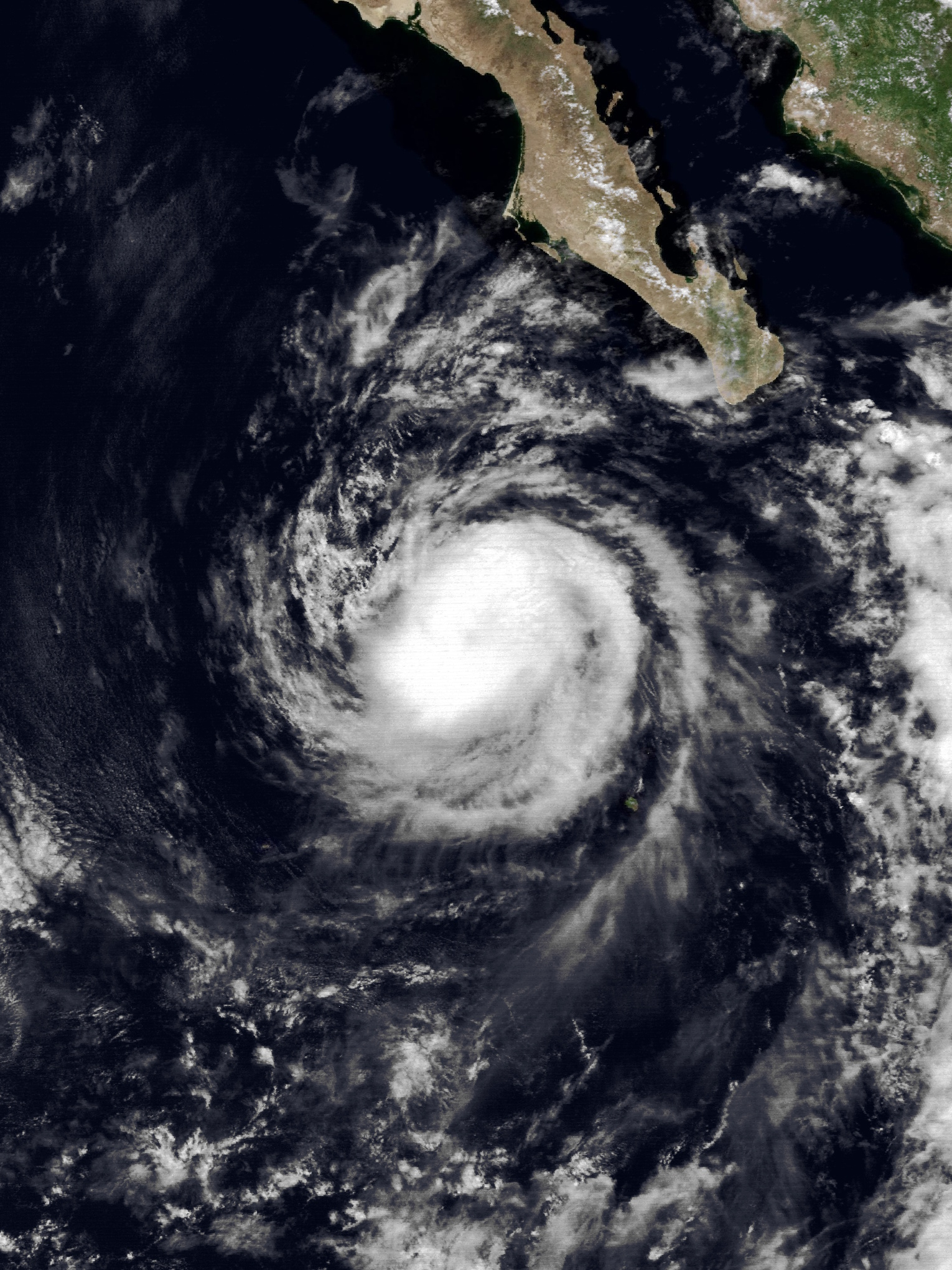
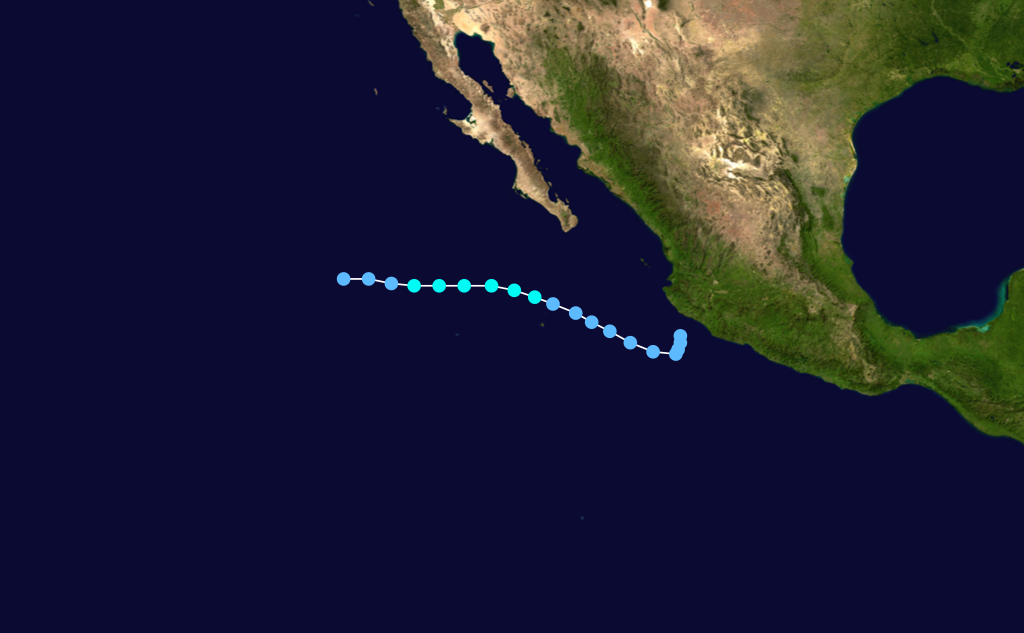
- Duration: July 17 – July 21
- Peak intensity: 60 mph (95 km/h) (1-min);

A tropical disturbance developed 70 mi (115 km) southwest of Manzanillo late on July 16. Several hours later, the disturbance was classified as a tropical depression. Initially, the depression drifted southward, but at 1800 UTC on July 17, the system suddenly turned west-northwest and accelerated. The storm gradually intensified while passing northeast of Socorro Island. Midday on July 19, the tropical depression was upgraded into Tropical Storm Flossie. Six hours later, Tropical Storm Flossie reached its peak wind speed of 60 mph (95 km/h). While the storm approached the Baja California peninsula, the storm ultimately turned west into an area of cool water and high amounts of wind shear. By 0000 UTC on July 21, Flossie weakened into a tropical storm. Twelve hours later, Flossie ceased to exist as a tropical cyclone.

=== Hurricane Gil ===
- Category 1 hurricane (SSHWS)
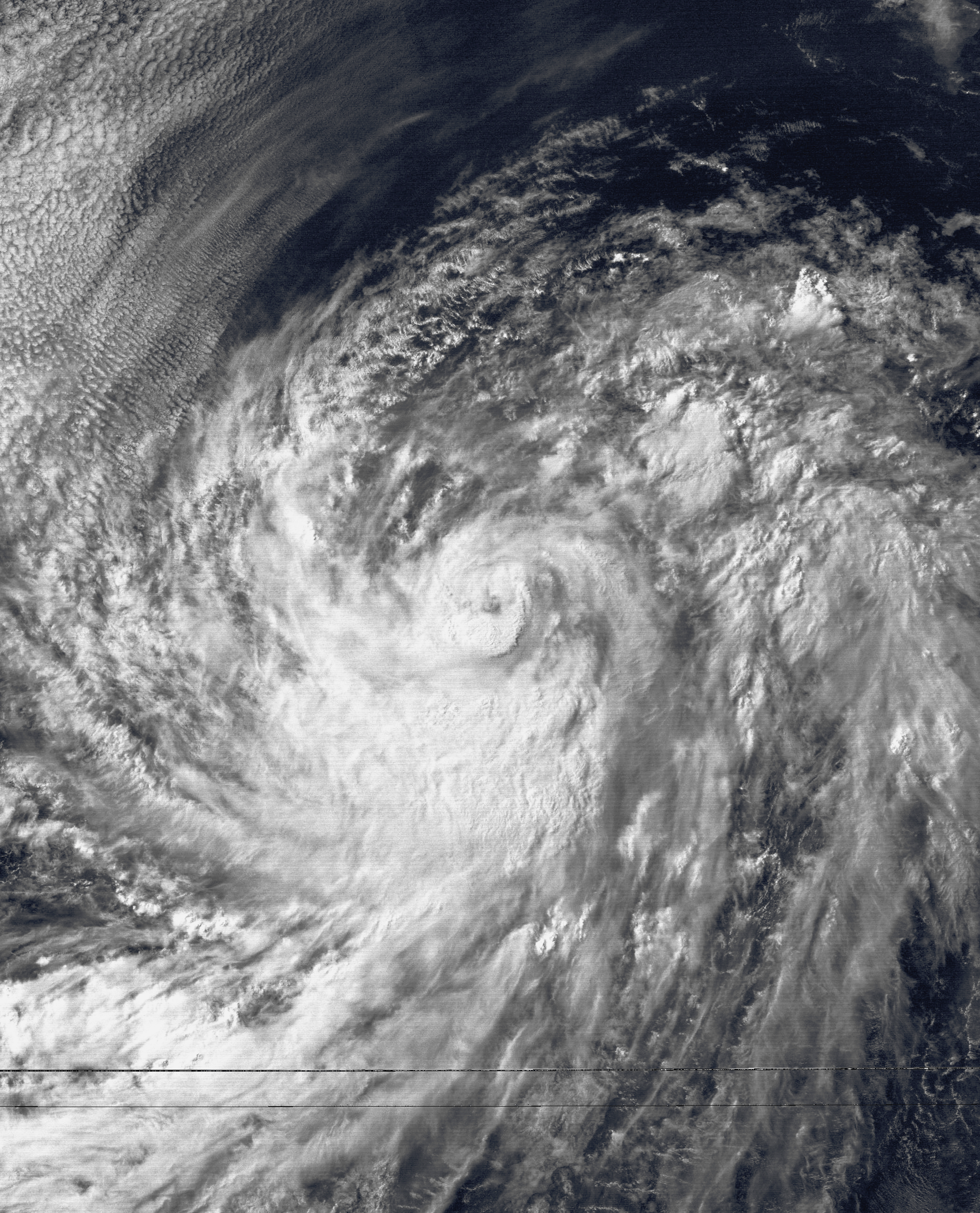
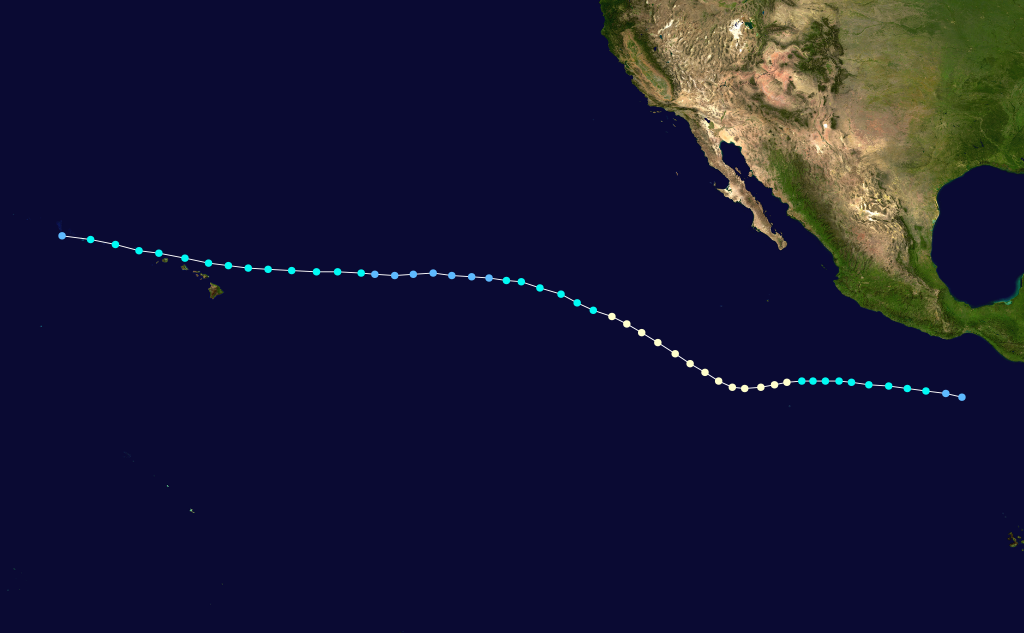
- Duration: July 23 – August 5
- Peak intensity: 90 mph (150 km/h) (1-min);

The seventh tropical cyclone of the season developed during the afternoon hours of July 23 north of Clipperton Island. Thereafter, the EPHC upgraded the depression to Tropical Storm Gil on July 24. Gil subsequently began to intensify; on 0000 UTC July 26, the storm was upgraded into a Category 1 hurricane. Early on July 27, the storm attained its peak intensity of 90 mph (150 km/h). Despite turning west-northwest, Hurricane Gil maintained hurricane intensity until July 29 when the storm began to encounter cooler waters. Two days later, Gil was downgraded a tropical depression. After entering CPHC's warning zone on August 1, Gil was re-upgraded into a tropical storm. Gil accelerated while approaching the Hawaiian Islands; on August 3, the tropical cyclone reached its secondary peak of 45 mph (75 km/h). After passing through the Hawaiian islands, Gil passed very close to French Frigate Shoals on August 4 as a marginal tropical storm. Early on August 5, the system was downgraded into a tropical depression and degenerated into a trough about 300 mi (485 km) west-northwest of Tern Island later that day.

Prior to arrival of Gil, gale warnings were issued for much of the islands, but on August 2, these warnings were discontinued for all islands except for Kauai. Jellyfish stung 50 tourists. On the northern part of the island, 70 mph (110 km/h) winds were reported, resulting in extensive damage in some areas, but slight damage to others. A minor power outage on the island briefly left 2,400 customers without electricity. In Maui, the outer rainbands of Gil led to minor flooding. Overall, damage from Gil was minimal and less than expected. Offshore, one person was presumed to have died when a 19 ft (5 m) catamaran, named Hurricane, went missing. Additionally, the 30-foot ship Adad nearly sunk in the storm and all three people on board sustained injuries.

=== Hurricane Henriette ===
- Category 4 hurricane (SSHWS)
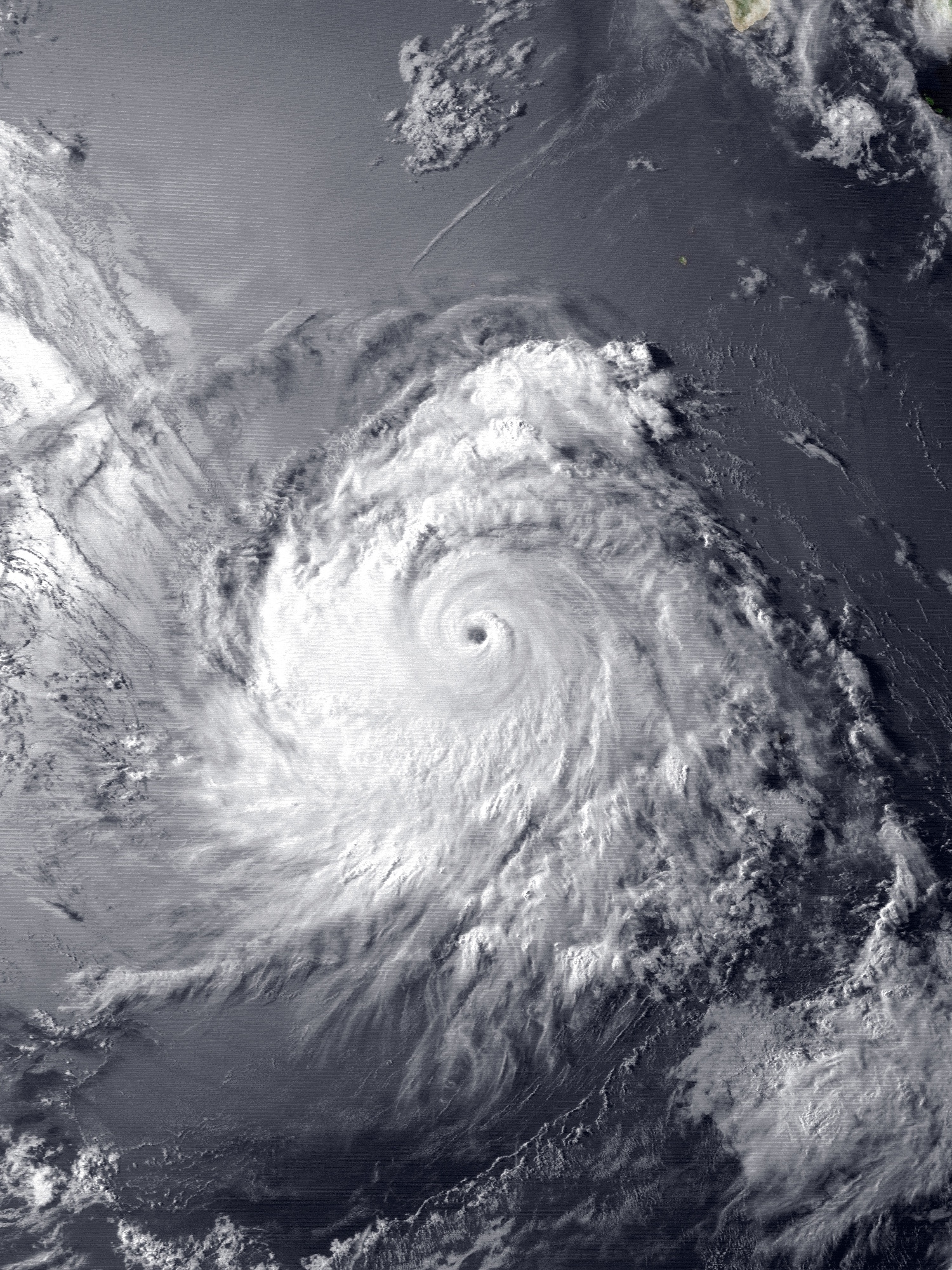
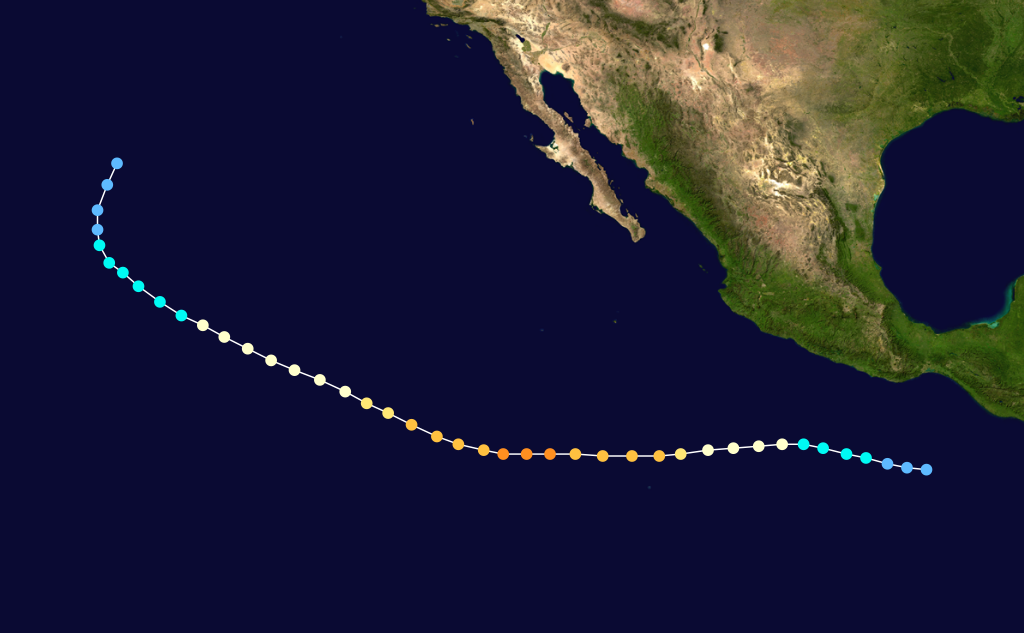
- Duration: July 27 – August 6
- Peak intensity: 130 mph (215 km/h) (1-min);

A tropical disturbance developed about 180 mi (290 km) south of the Guatemala coastline. After developing a circulation, the system was upgraded into a tropical depression on July 27. Moving west-northwest, the depression strengthened into Tropical Storm Henriette at 1800 UTC that day. Henriette continued to deepen, and by late on July 28, the storm attained winds of 65 mph (105 km/h). Although initially expected to pose a threat to Hawaii, this did not occur. It rapidly intensified, and late on July 28, the EPHC upgraded the storm into a hurricane. While turning west-southwest on a track similar to Gil's, it attained Category 2 intensity on July 29. At 0000 UTC on July 30, Henriette was upgraded into a Category 3 hurricane. After leveling off in intensity, the storm passed within 70 mi (115 km) within Clipperton Island. Hurricane Henriette attained its peak intensity early on July 31, with winds of 130 mph (215 km/h), a Category 4 system. At peak, Henriette displayed a well-defined eye.

After continuing west-northwest for 12 hours, it then veered northwest and began to encounter cooler ocean temperatures. Henriette was slow to weaken, and by August 2, it was downgraded into a Category 2 hurricane. Two days later, Henriette was downgraded into a tropical storm. A strong trough of low pressure pulled Henriette northwest, and later north. On August 5, the storm was downgraded into a tropical depression. The storm dissipated the next day at a high latitude, though the remnants of Henriette brought cloud cover to Oregon and Washington.

=== Tropical Depression Nine-E ===
- Tropical depression (SSHWS)
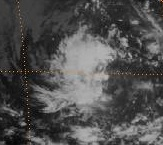
- Duration: August 3 – August 7
- Peak intensity: 35 mph (55 km/h) (1-min);

On July 30 and 31, a tropical disturbance crossed Central America. At a low latitude, a tropical depression was declared on August 3. At first, the storm was expected to turn west-northwest, but it continued west instead. Nine-E failed to intensify despite being situated over warm water. The depression dissipated on August 7 later over somewhat cooler water.

=== Hurricane Ismael ===
- Category 2 hurricane (SSHWS)
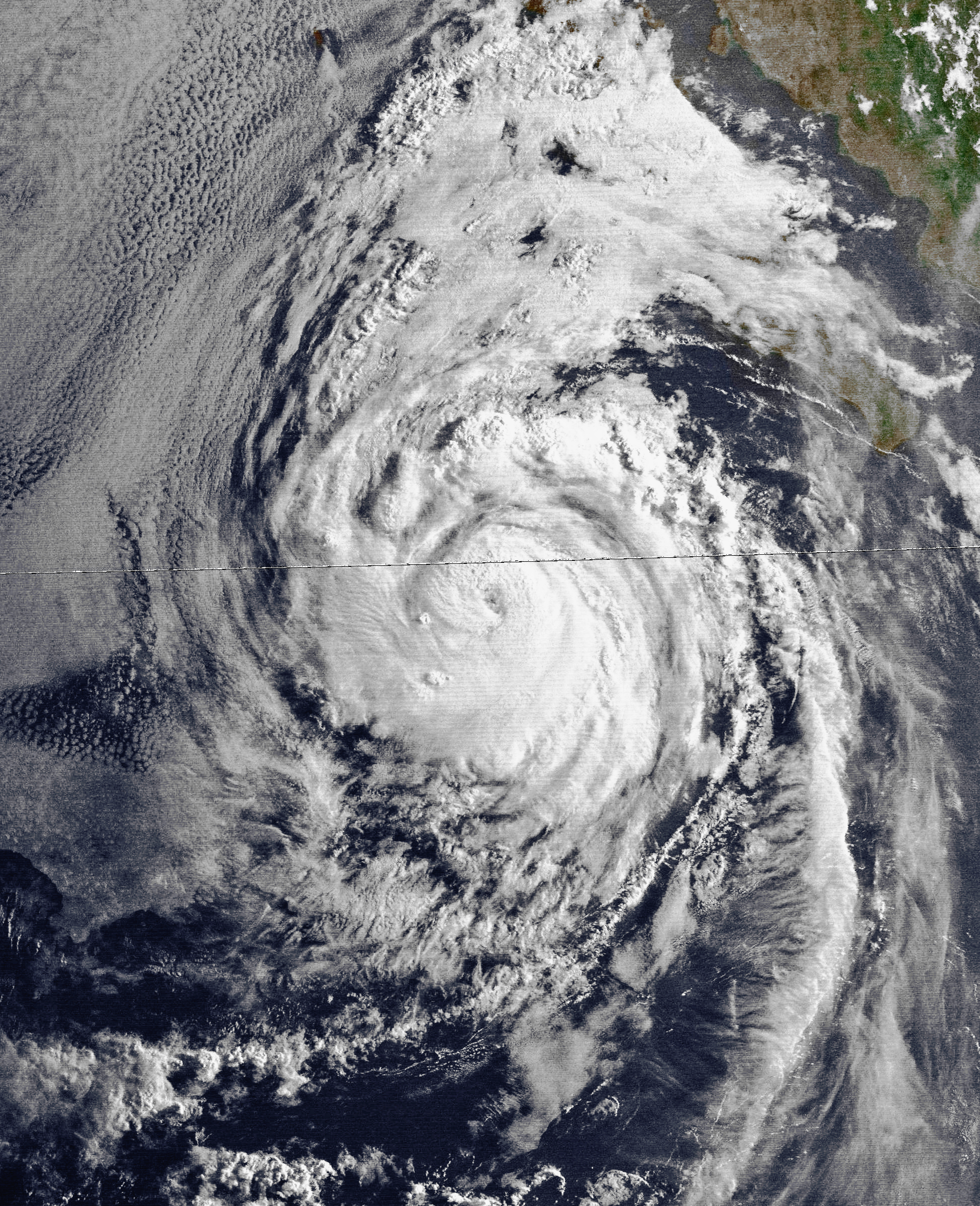
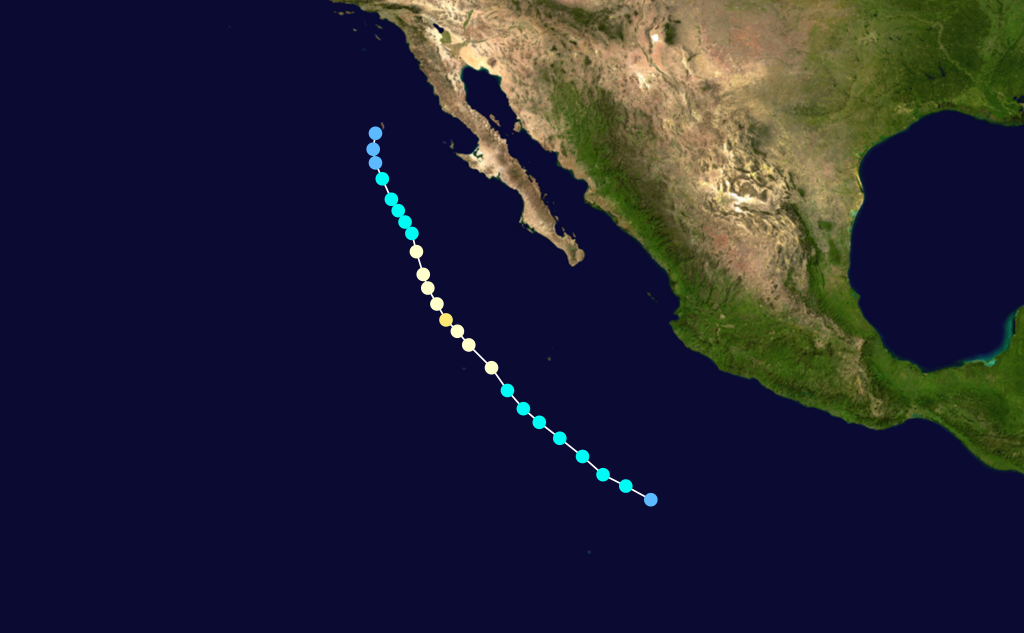
- Duration: August 8 – August 14
- Peak intensity: 100 mph (155 km/h) (1-min);

The origins of Hurricane Ismael were from a northward bulge of the Intertropical Convergence Zone (ITCZ) in early August, which resulted in the formation of a tropical depression on August 8. Six hours later, it was upgraded into Tropical storm Ismael. Continuing to intensity, Ismael was upgraded into a hurricane late on August 10 and subsequently developed an eye. The storm soon reached its peak of 100 mph (155 km/h). Late on August 11, Hurricane Ismael began to weaken as it encountered cooler waters and the hurricane was soon downgraded to a Category 1 on the SSHWS. The following day, Ismael was downgraded into a tropical storm about 380 mi (610 km) west of the Baja California peninsula. On August 14, the storm was downgraded into a tropical depression while centered about 250 mi (400 km) west of Point Ensenada. Ismael dissipated that day.

While still out at sea, Ismael brought 6–9 ft (1.8–2.7 m) waves to much of Southern California, though waves from the storm were less than expected. One person was swept away at a beach. The remnants of the storm later moved over Southern California, resulting in moderate rainfall. The Yucca Valley was the worst hit by the storm, where nearly every road was washed out. Almost 50,000 residents in Palm Springs were isolated due to rains. A tornado near Los Angeles led to minor damage. In San Bernardino, many buildings were destroyed, forcing numerous evacuations. Around 80,000 homes were left without power across the Inland Empire. Moreover, three interstates were closed. In all, minor injuries were reported and three people died in San Bernardino when their car swept into a channel. Damage from the storm totaled $19 million (1983 USD). After affecting California, the remnants of the hurricane moved into Nevada. Many parking lots in Laughlin were flooded. Two small towns were also isolated. Several major streets in the outskirts of Las Vegas were closed because of flooding.

=== Tropical Depression Eleven-E ===
- Tropical depression (SSHWS)
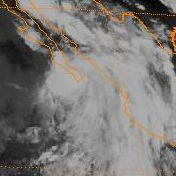
- Duration: August 15 – August 16
- Peak intensity: 35 mph (55 km/h) (1-min);

The eleventh cyclone of the 1983 season formed from an intense area of thunderstorms located over the Yucatán Peninsula on August 11 and 12. After crossing the Mexican mainland, it emerged into the Pacific basin near Guadalajara early on August 13. After turning northwest, it intensified into a depression two days later after showing sign of a circulation. The depression continued northwest with little change in wind speed, and on August 16, about 24 hours after formation, the depression dissipated after its circulation ceased very close to landfall on the Baja California peninsula.

=== Tropical Depression One-C ===
- Tropical depression (SSHWS)
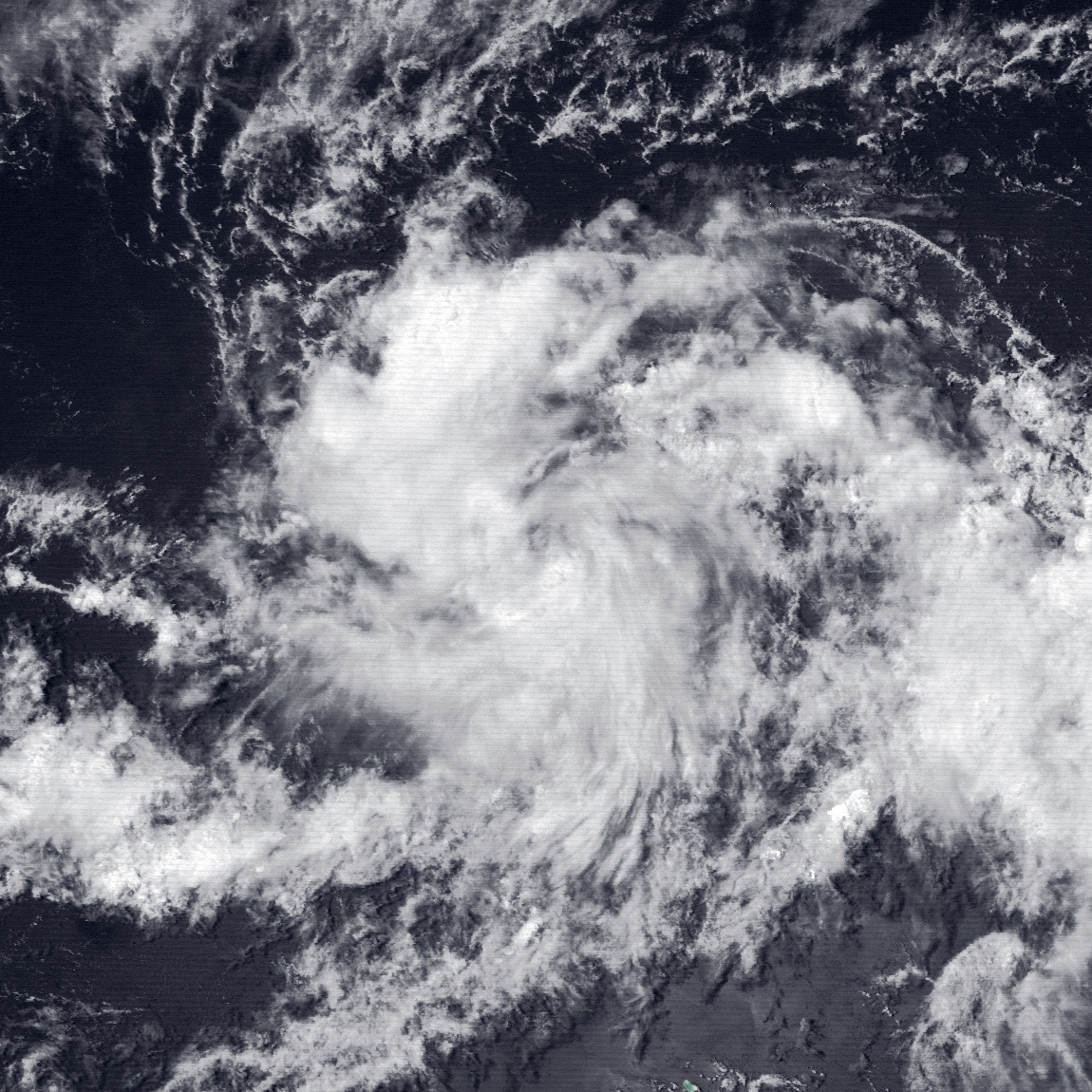
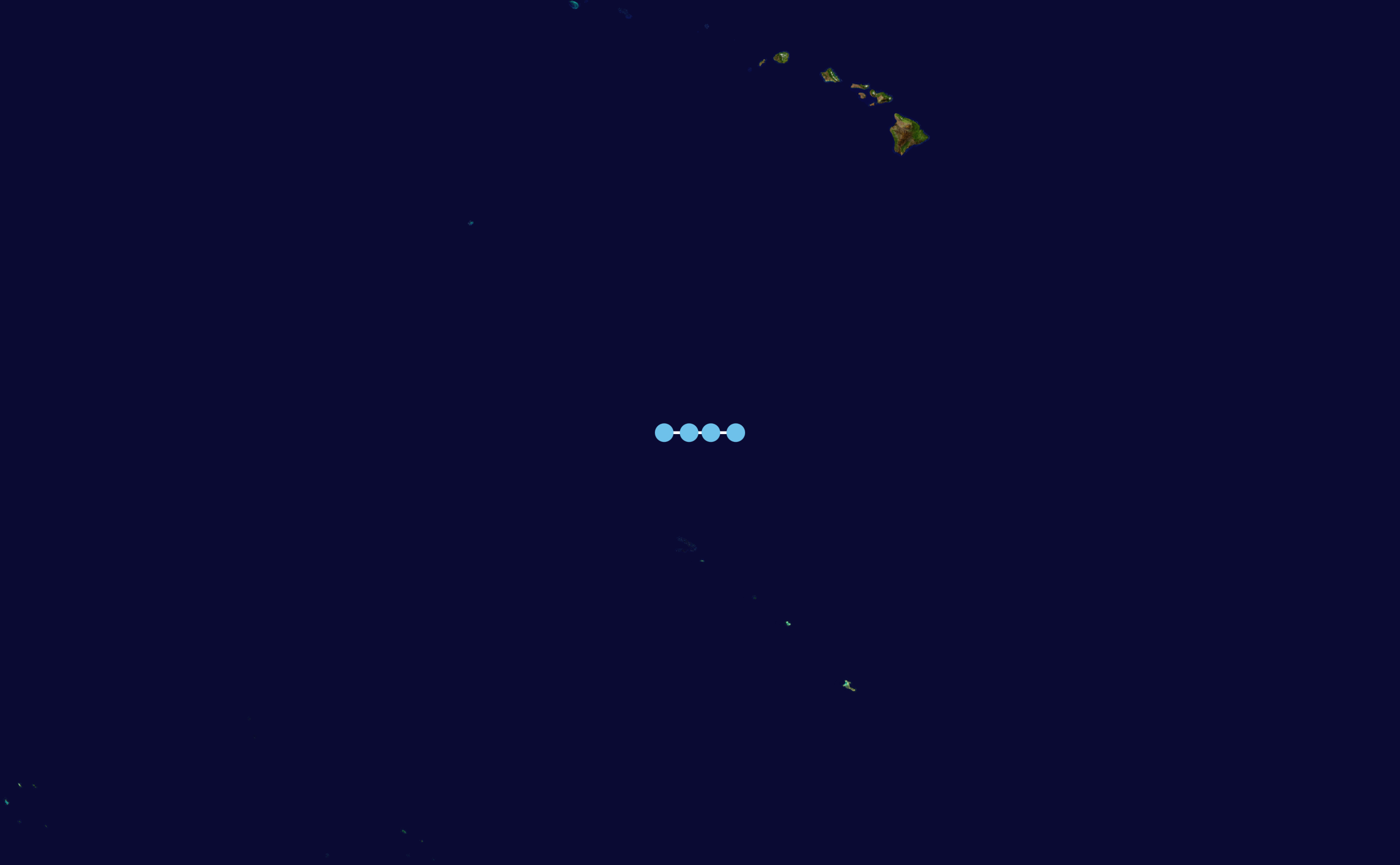
- Duration: August 19 – August 20
- Peak intensity: 35 mph (55 km/h) (1-min);

Tropical Depression One-C formed on August 19 far from land, with winds of 35 mph (56 km/h). It moved steadily west. Despite being over warm waters, One-C quickly weakened and lost deep convection. The depression dissipated on August 20 after briefly developing a closed circulation.

=== Tropical Storm Juliette ===
- Tropical storm (SSHWS)
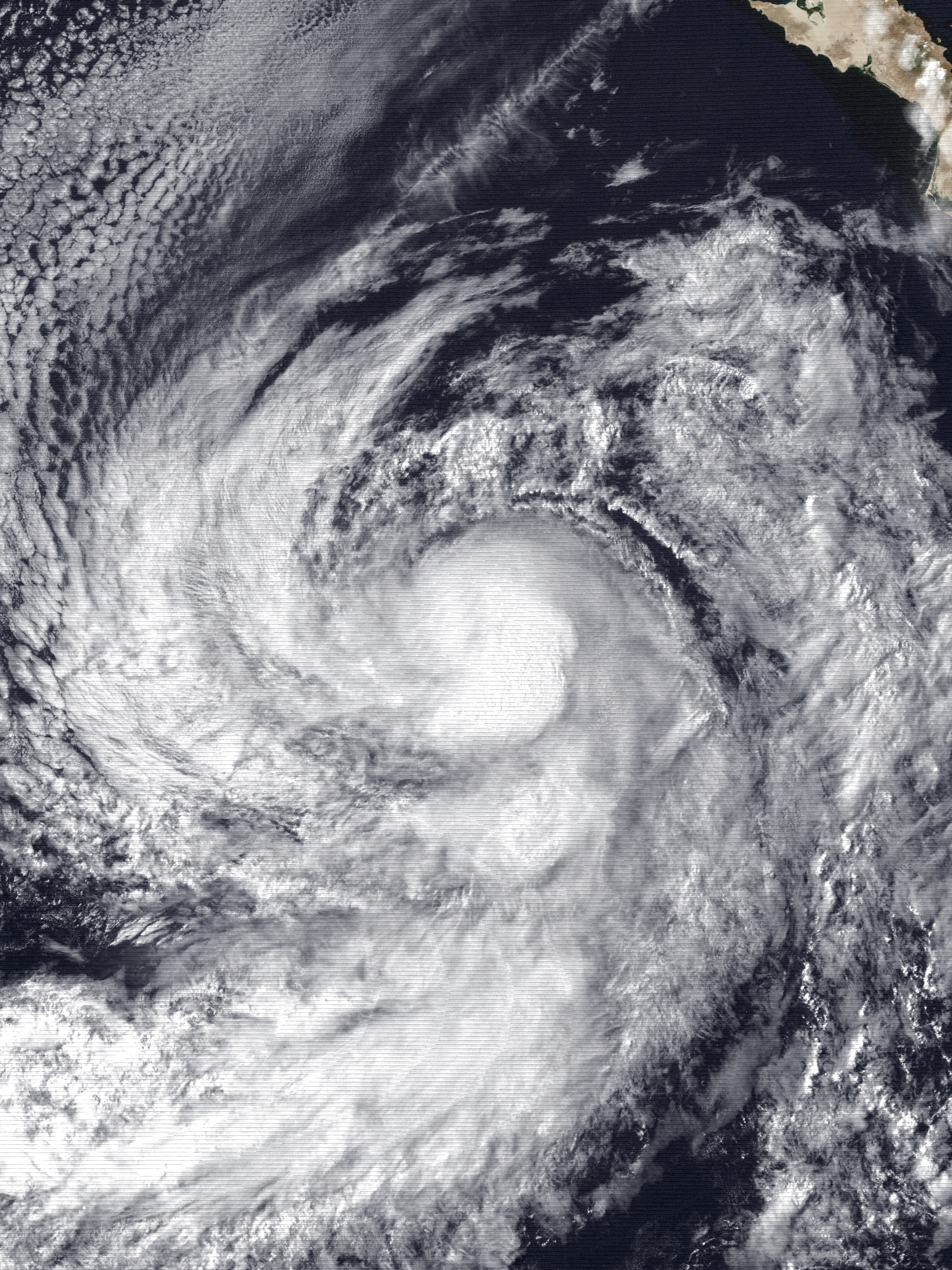
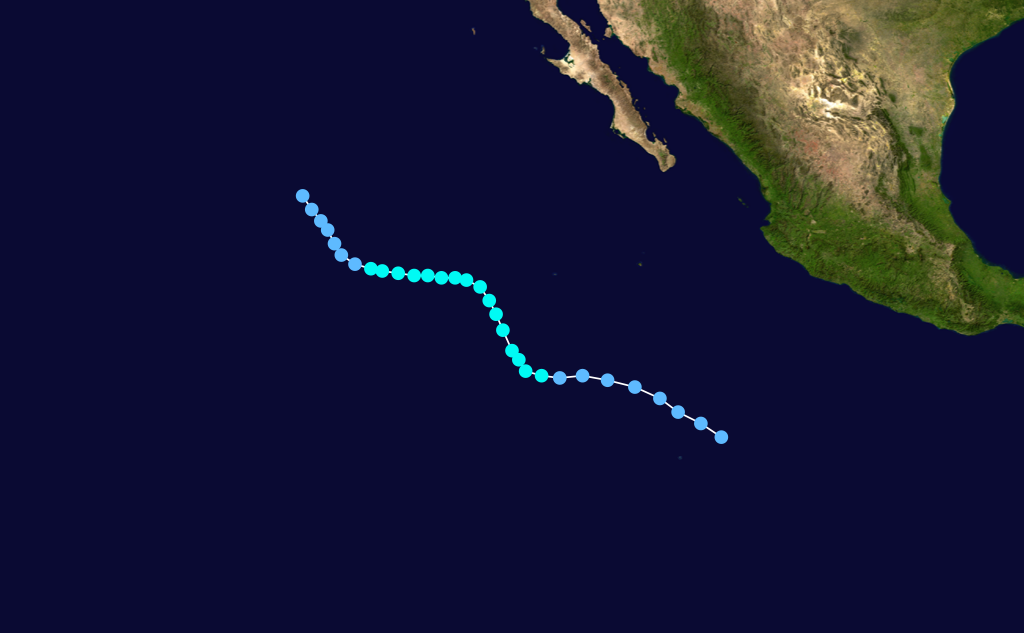
- Duration: August 24 – September 1
- Peak intensity: 60 mph (95 km/h) (1-min);

Tropical Storm Juliette originated from a tropical depression that first formed on August 24 130 mi (210 km) east-northeast of Clipperton Island. Moving west-northwest and briefly west, the depression gradually intensified. The system then turned northwest around a ridge off the west coast of Baja California Sur. At 1800 UTC on August 26, the EPHC announced that the depression had strengthened into a tropical storm. Moving toward a strong trough off the west coast of the peninsula, Juliette reached its peak intensity as a mid-level tropical storm early on August 29, with winds of 60 mph (95 km/h). Upon attaining peak intensity, Juliette developed an eye. However, Juliette began to weaken over cooler water. Meanwhile, the trough weakened and Tropical Storm Juliette headed west. On August 30, the EPHC remarked that Juliette was downgraded into a depression. Two days later, Tropical Depression Juliette had dissipated over cold water.

=== Tropical Depression Two-C ===
- Tropical depression (SSHWS)
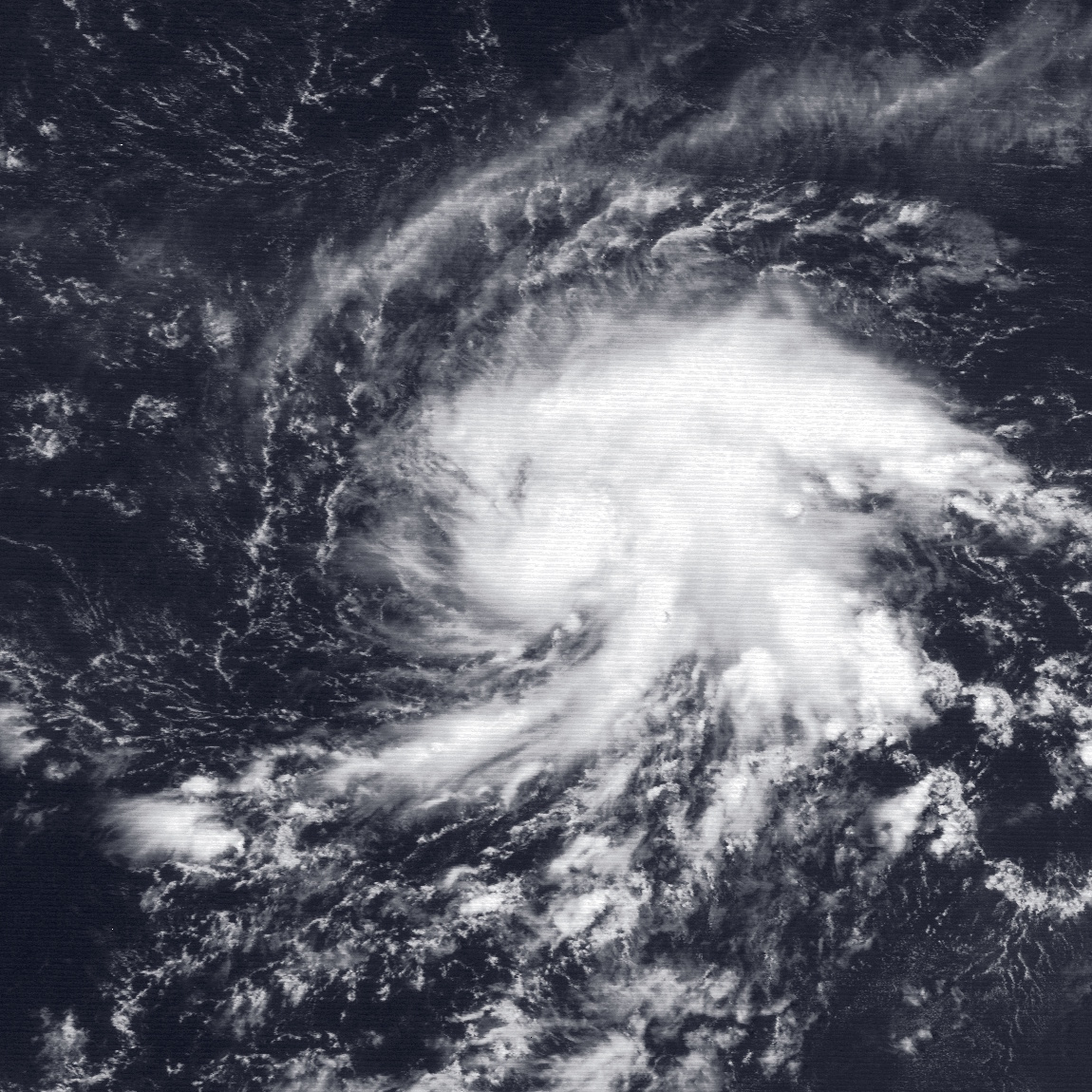
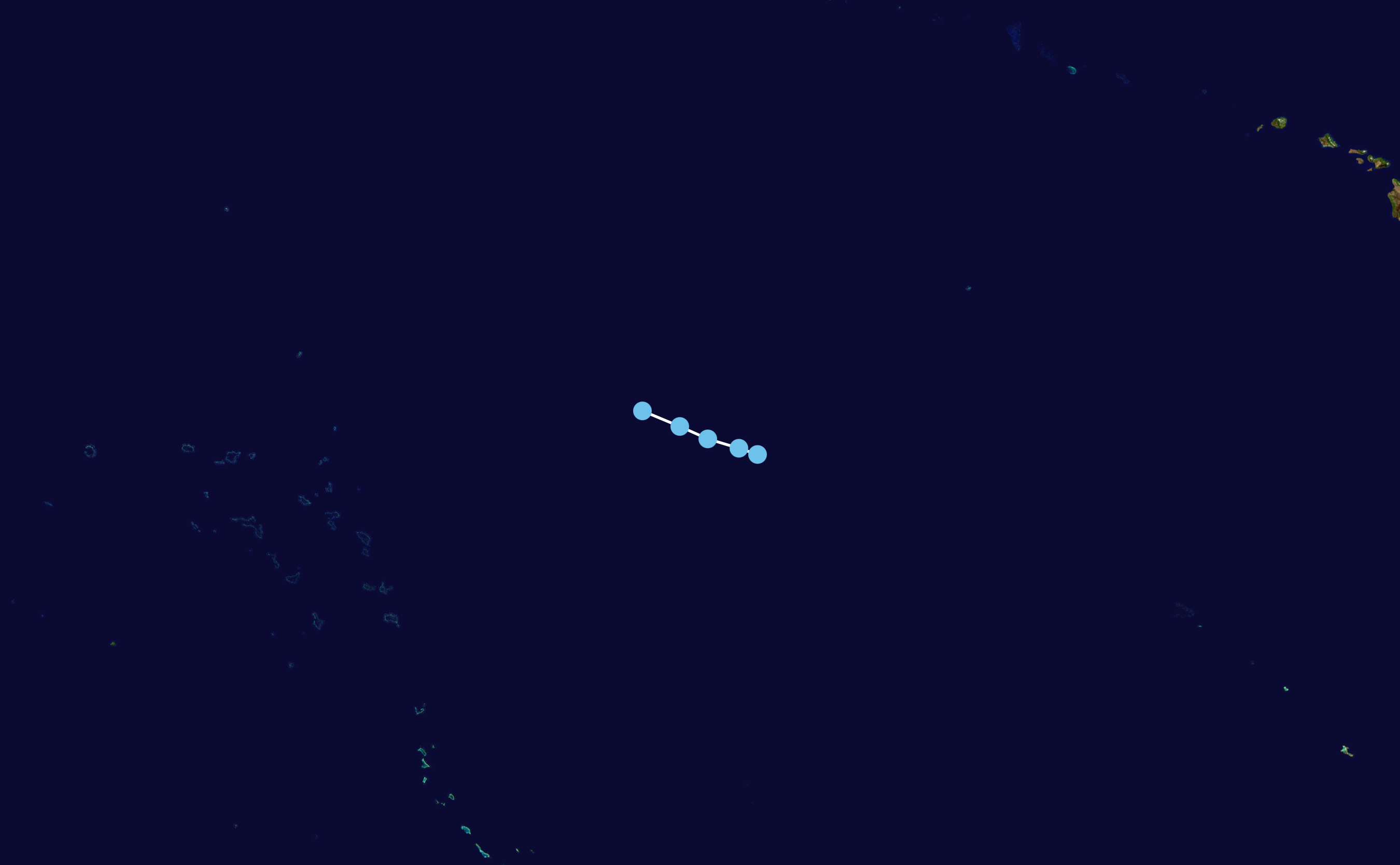
- Duration: August 31 – September 1 (Exited basin)
- Peak intensity: 35 mph (55 km/h) (1-min);

A disturbance in the ITCZ developed a circulation on August 29 and organized into a tropical depression two days later. Traveling west-northwest, Two-C was initially in a favorable environment, and was thus expected to become a tropical storm. However, it soon encountered a trough and dry air, which arrested development. It crossed the international dateline on September 1 and the Joint Typhoon Warning Center began issuing advisories on the system. The depression gradually weakened and dissipated on September 8. Its remnants lingered near the Marshall Islands for a few more days.

=== Hurricane Kiko ===
- Category 4 hurricane (SSHWS)
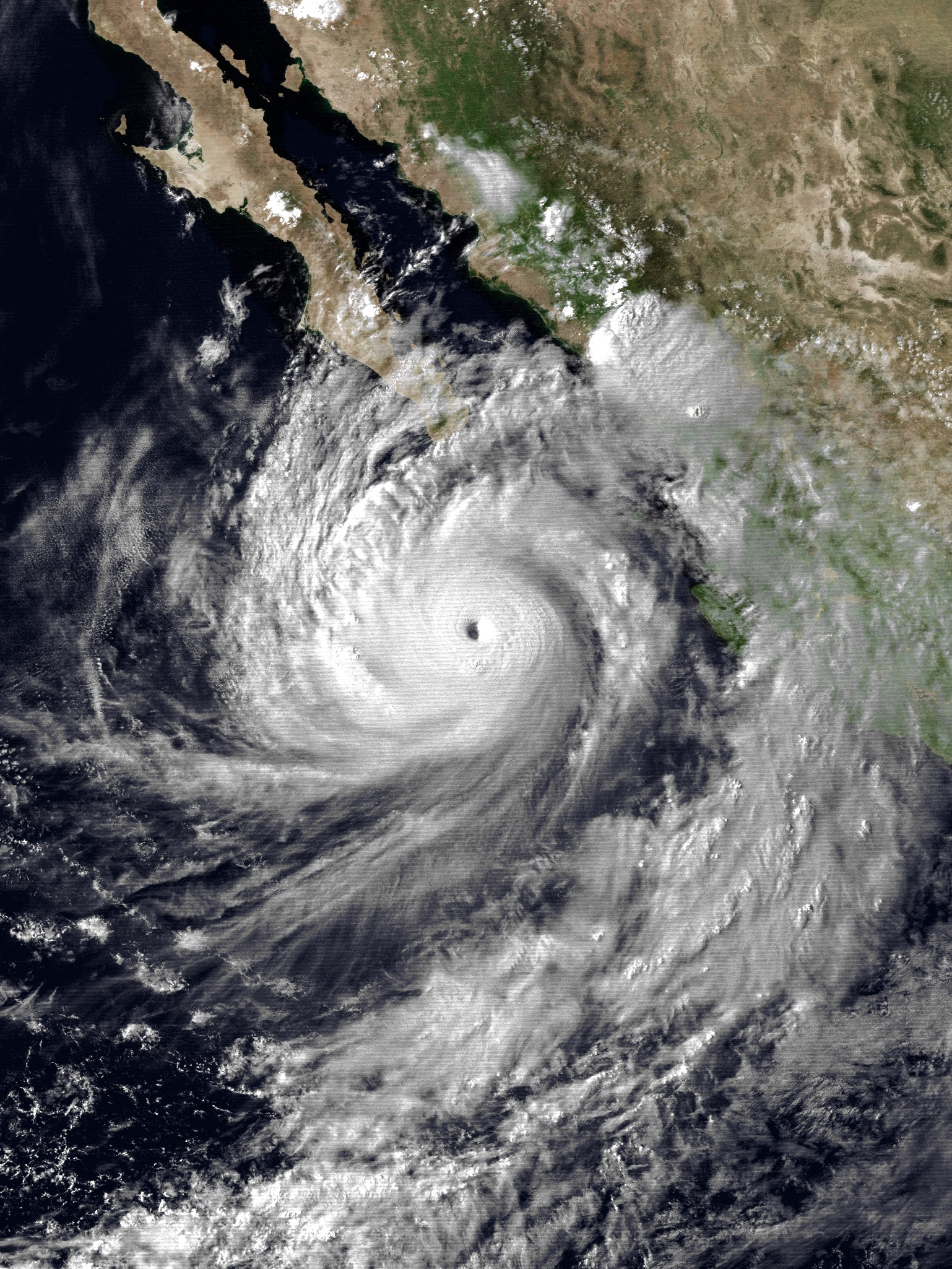
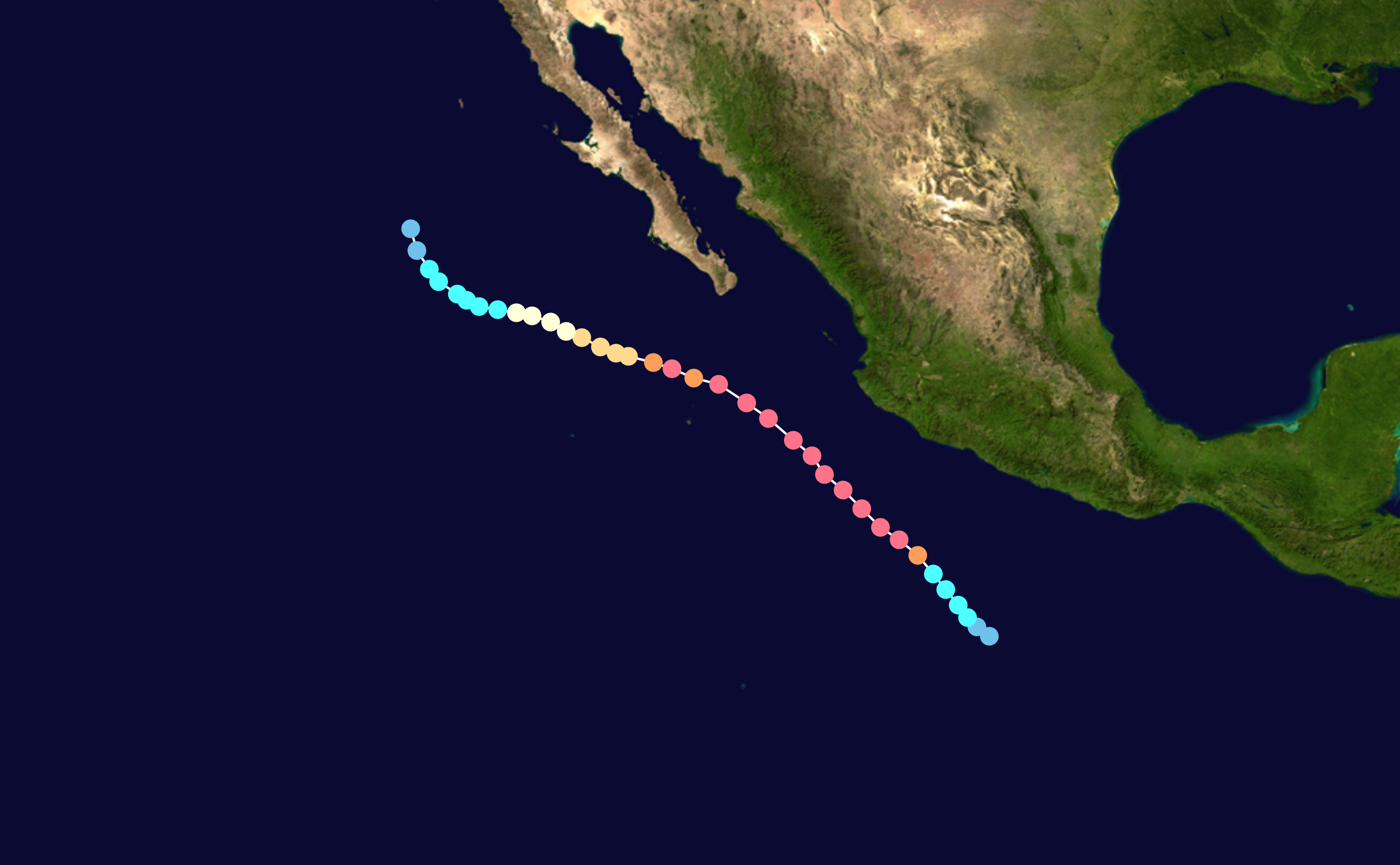
- Duration: August 31 – September 9
- Peak intensity: 145 mph (230 km/h) (1-min);

Hurricane Kiko originated from a tropical disturbance that crossed Central America on August 26 and 27. After emerging into the Pacific, the disturbance moved steadily westward. At 0600 UTC on August 31, the EPHC classified the system as a tropical depression about 300 mi (485 km) south of Salina Cruz. A well-developed ridge was centered over New Mexico and was moving southward, causing light wind shear over the system. At 1800 UTC on August 31, the depression intensified into Tropical Storm Kiko. Initially expected to turn west and head out to sea, the storm moved northwest while paralleling the Mexican coast. Early on September 1, Kiko began to explosively deepen, and by 1800 UTC, it intensified into a Category 3 hurricane on the SSHWS, bypassing both Category 1 and 2 status. Six hours later, the EPHC reported that Kiko had intensified into a low-end Category 4. After remaining at this intensity for 30 hours, the hurricane resumed intensification, attaining its peak intensity of 145 mph (230 km/h) late on September 3 about 400 mi (645 km) west of Lázaro Cárdenas.

Shortly after its peak, a combination of cooler waters and increased wind shear associated with the subtropical jetstream resulted in rapid weakening. Hurricane Kiko was soon downgraded to Category 3 status on the SSHWS, before briefly re-intensifying on September 4. That day, Kiko resumed weakening and was downgraded to a Category 2 as the storm turned west-northwest away from the Mexican coast. On September 5, the storm was downgraded into a Category 1 system; by this time, the EPHC revised their forecast and expected the storm to accelerate and approach Baja California. On September 7, Kiko weakened into a tropical storm. Subsequently, the system turned north and was downgraded to a tropical depression the next day. Now devoid of convection, Kiko dissipated early on September 9 about 450 mi (725 km) west-southwest of Baja California.

The outer rainbands of Hurricane Kiko caused considerable damage to homes and hotels situated near the coast of Mexico, forcing the evacuation of hundreds. The resorts of Tecomán and Manzanillo were the worst hit by the storm. Outside of Colima, however, little damage was reported. Kiko brought high clouds to the extreme southwestern portion of the Baja California Peninsula for four days. While at sea, Hurricane Kiko was responsible for 12 ft (3.7 m) waves along Newport Beach, California, resulting in more than 100 lifeguard rescues. As a weakening tropical system, Kiko brought subtropical moisture and high clouds to California.

=== Hurricane Lorena ===
- Category 3 hurricane (SSHWS)
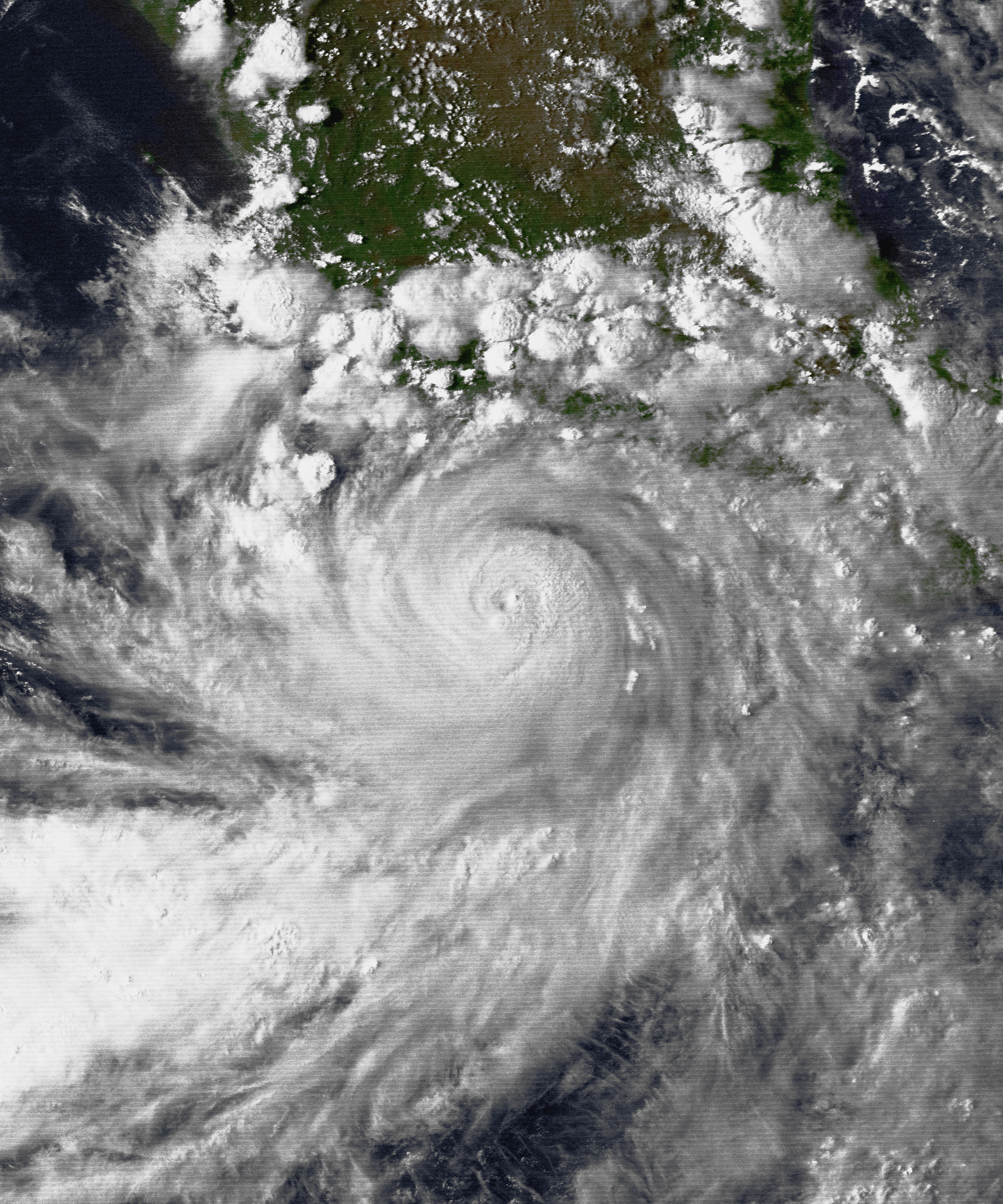
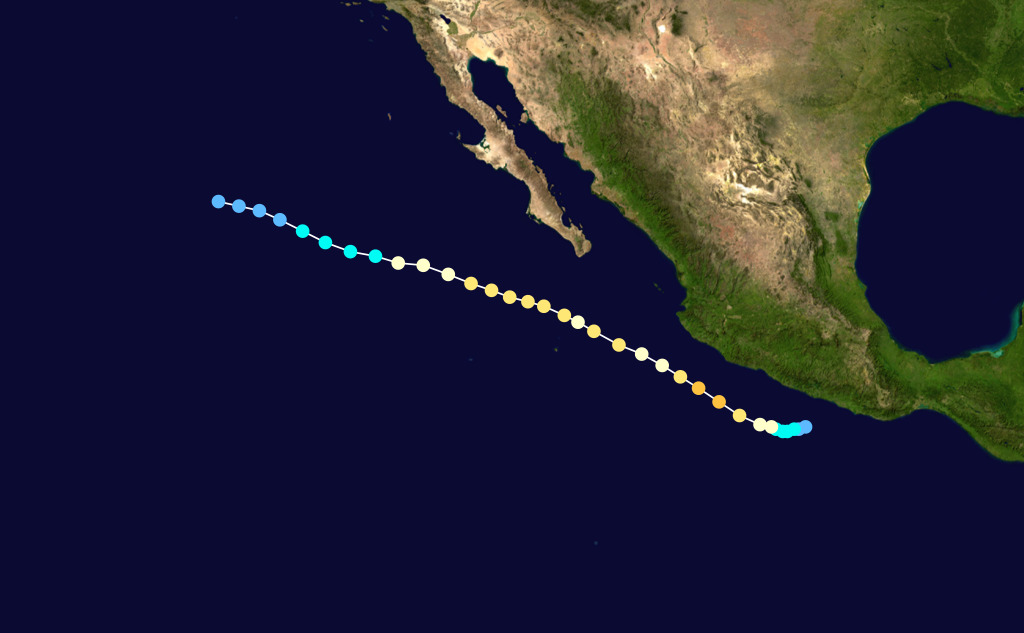
- Duration: September 6 – September 14
- Peak intensity: 115 mph (185 km/h) (1-min);

Towards the end of the first week of September, the next cyclone of the season was starting to form south of the Mexican coast. A disturbance moved westward and was classified as a tropical depression about 90 mi (145 km) south of Acapulco early on September 6. Like Kiko, the storm deepened rapidly, and was upgraded into a tropical storm at 1800 UTC that day. Initially moving very slowly, the storm made a sharp turn northwest, parallel to the coast of Mexico. Accelerating, a poorly defined eye first became visible on satellite imagery around 1500 UTC on September 7. The EPHC upgraded Lorena into a hurricane three hours later. Early the next day, Lorena intensified into a Category 2 hurricane. At 1200 UTC on September 8, Lorena attained winds of a Category 3 hurricane on the SSHWS; simultaneously, the storm reached its peak intensity, with winds of 115 mph (185 km/h).

After maintaining peak intensity for six hours, Lorena began to weaken over cooler waters. Very early on September 9, the EPHC downgraded Lorena weakened into a Category 1 hurricane; the storm was expected to emerge into the southern Gulf of California in about 48 hours and thereafter meander. However, this did not occur. Meanwhile, Lorena was re-upgraded into a Category 2 hurricane, an intensity of which it held on to for 12 hours. After briefly weakening back to a Category 1 hurricane, Lorena moved west-northwest and into a low wind shear environment. Subsequently, Lorena attained its secondary peak with winds of 105 mph (170 km/h) while passing about 150 mi (240 km) south of Cabo San Lucas. However, cooler water began to take its toll on the storm and on September 12, the storm was downgraded into a Category 1. Later that day, Lorena weakened into a tropical storm due to a combination of strong shear and cold sea surface temperatures. Midday on September 13, the EPHC downgraded the system into a tropical depression. Furthermore, the system dissipated 18 hours later. At the time of dissipation, Lorena was centered about 750 mi (1,205 km) west-southwest of San Diego.

Hurricane Lorena brought rough surf and squally weather to much of the coast of Mexico, particularly Manzanillo. Furthermore, it was also responsible for $33,000 in damage to Acapulco. Seven people died due to flooding. Four ships drowned in the storm; as a result, many local ports were closed. In addition, a mudslide blocked a portion of the Pan-American Highway.

=== Hurricane Manuel ===
- Category 3 hurricane (SSHWS)
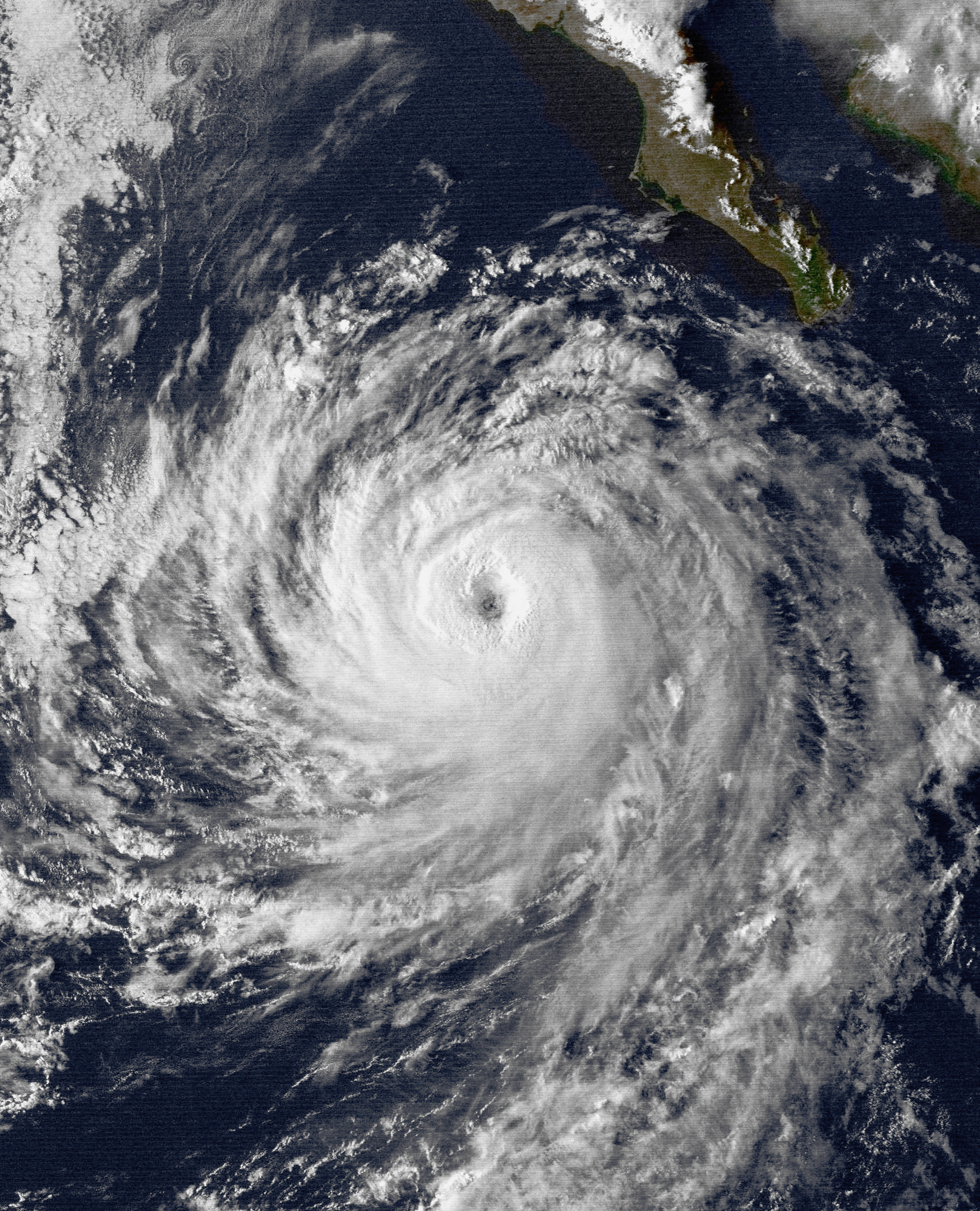
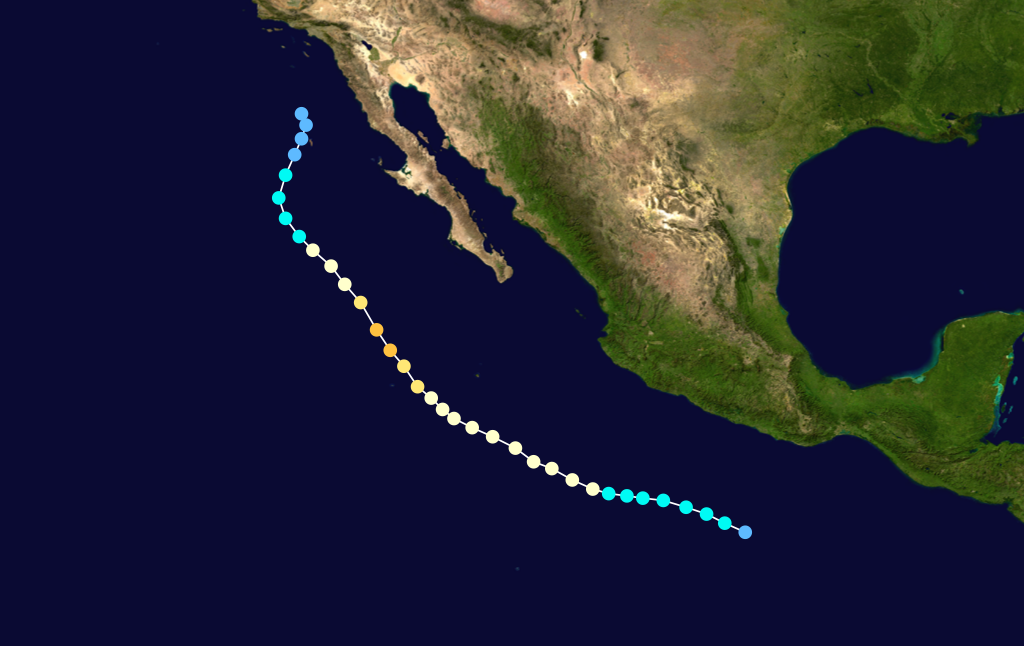
- Duration: September 12 – September 20
- Peak intensity: 115 mph (185 km/h) (1-min);

A vigorous tropical disturbance was first noted on September 10 south of the Gulf of Tehuantepec. Despite the presence of wind shear, the EPHC upgraded system into a tropical depression at 0600 UTC on September 12 and a tropical storm at 1200 UTC that day while centered around 300 mi (485 km) south of Puerto Escondido. Manuel reached hurricane strength early on September 14. Several hours later, Manuel reached a secondary peak wind speed of 90 mph (145 km/h). However, this trend was short lived, and very early on September 15, the storm's wind diminished to 75 mph (120 km/h), only to reintensify again that evening. Early on September 16, Manuel turned towards the north while developing a small eye. Hurricane Manuel maintained winds of 90 mph (145 km/h) for a day before the EPHC upgraded Manuel into a Category 2 hurricane. On September 17, however, Manuel developed a much larger and well-defined eye; that afternoon; Manuel reaching its peak intensity of 115 mph (185 km/h) as a major hurricane.

The storm held onto major hurricane winds for 12 hours before subsequently weakening. At 0000 UTC on September 18, the eye collapsed as it began to encounter colder ocean temperatures. Manuel was intercepted by a Hurricane Hunter aircraft that day, which found no evidence of an eyewall, thus, Manuel was downgraded into a tropical storm about 600 mi (965 km) south of San Diego. After turning north-northeast, Hurricane Hunters penetrated the storm for the second time, noting that the storm was a swirl of clouds. On September 19, the EPHC downgraded the system into a depression. The following day, Manuel made landfall along the eastern portion of Guadalupe Island before dissipating at 1200 UTC.

The remnants of Hurricane Manuel later brought rain to the southwestern United States. The outer rainbands of Manuel began to produce moisture over the region on September 18, and continued until September 21. In the mountains and deserts of California, the storm brought heavy rains across. A laboratory near Palm Springs recorded a peak rainfall total of 2.85 in (72 mm). A total 3,000 customers lost electricity in Porterville because of high winds, heavy rains, which led to minor damage. Numerous fires occurred in Kern County, but none of these fires caused major damage. Further east, in Arizona, isolated rain showers were reported, peaking at 2.56 in (65 mm) at the Alamo Dam. Along the northern portion of Baja California, Manuel brought showers and high waves. In all, impact from the storm was less than anticipated.

=== Tropical Storm Narda ===
- Tropical storm (SSHWS)
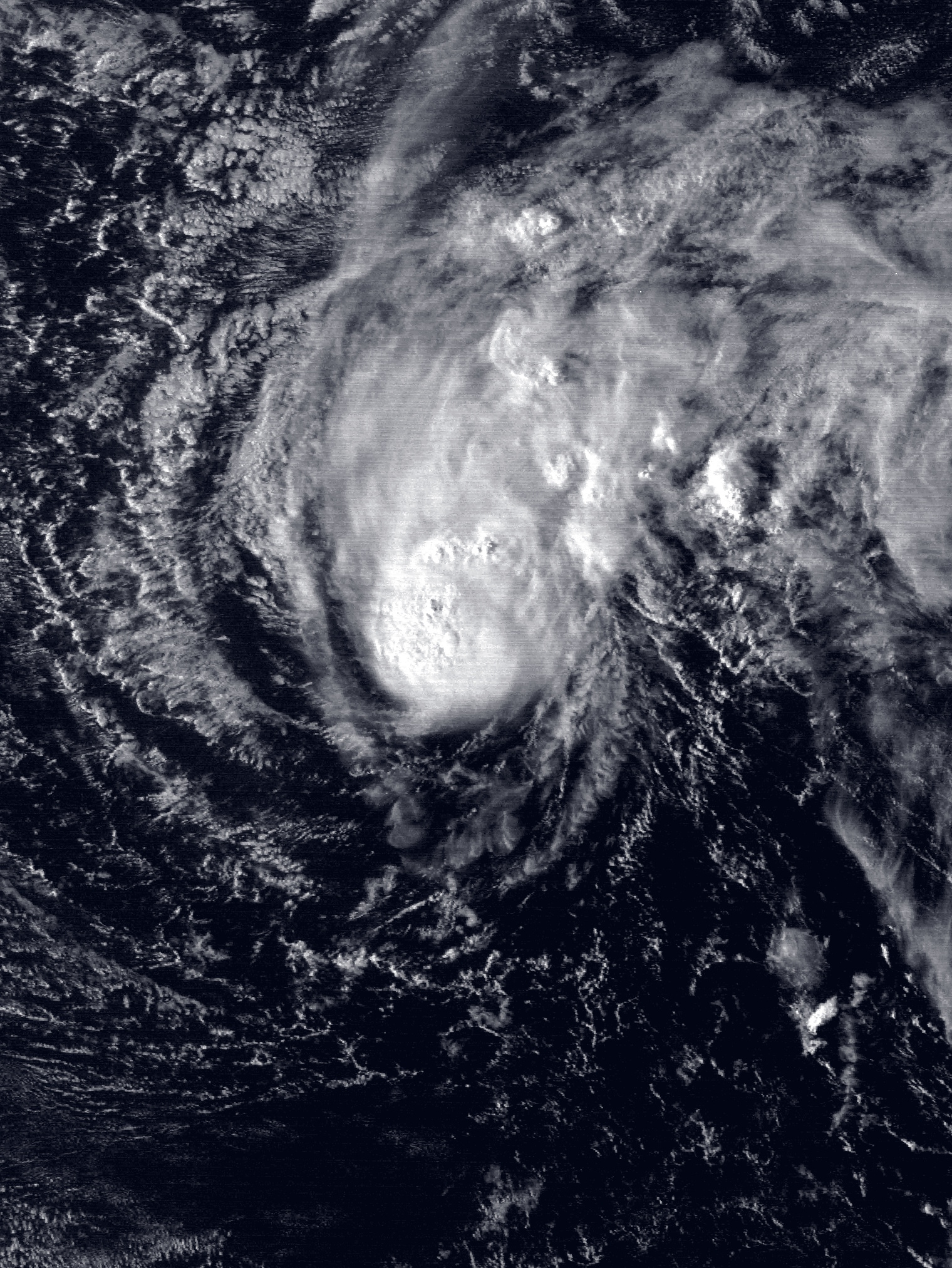
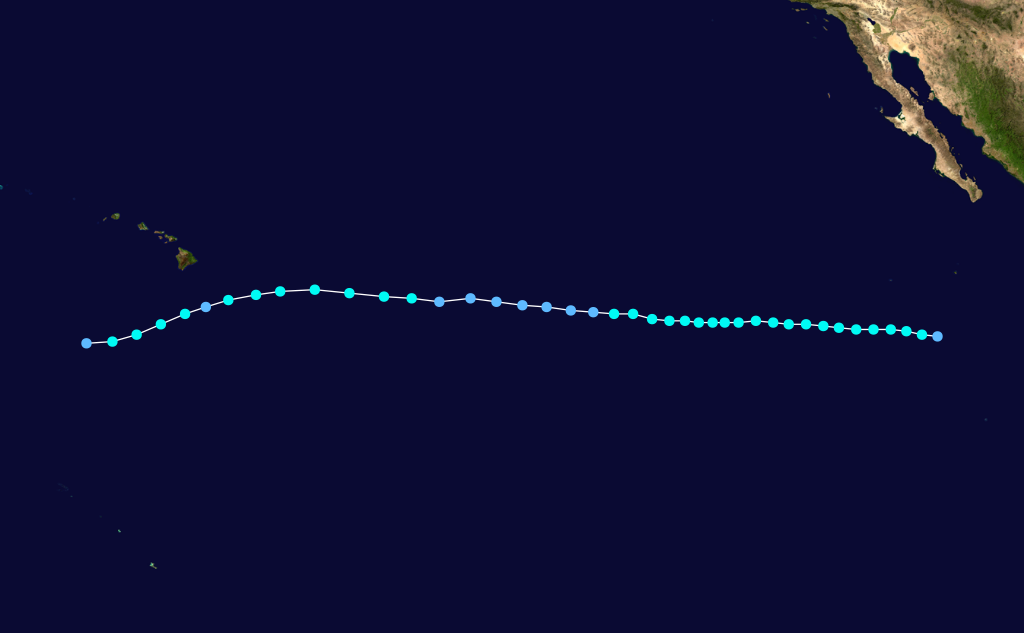
- Duration: September 21 – October 1
- Peak intensity: 70 mph (110 km/h) (1-min);

Several hours after Manuel dissipated on September 20, a tropical disturbance formed 200 mi (320 km) south of Socorro Island. While situated south of a ridge, the disturbance started to deepen. After developing a circulation, the system was declared a tropical depression the morning of September 21. Later that morning, the EPHC upgraded the disturbance into a tropical storm. Narda held on to marginal tropical storm intensity for 36 hours before quickly intensifying, and by September 23, the storm had attained winds of 60 mph (95 km/h). Thereafter, the storm turned west-northwest and weakened steadily after encountering cooler water. On September 26, the EPHC downgraded Narda into a depression. After accelerating, the storm entered the CPHC zone the next day.

Tropical Storm Narda then began to encounter slightly warmer waters, and thus began to restrengthen. At 1800 UTC on September 27, the CPHC announced that Narda had regained tropical storm strength. It quickly intensified and early on September 29, a Hurricane Hunter aircraft reported winds of 70 mph (110 km/h) and the formation of an eye. At this time, Narda was located about 300 mi (485 km) southeast of Hilo. That evening, the storm start to show signs of weakening as it turned southwest away from the Hawaiian group. On September 30, however, Narda, with winds of 50 mph (80 km/h), made its closest approach the Hawaii, passing 150 mi (240 km) south of South Point. After briefly intensifying on October 1, it suddenly dissipated hours later.

Because of data from tropical cyclone forecast models, which showed Narda passing very near the Hawaiian islands, and fears of a repeat of Hurricane Iwa, a hurricane watch was posted for all the Hawaiian Islands at 0700 UTC on September 28. Gale warnings and high surf advisories were issued for the entire state. Officials urged many Hawaiians to complete preparations by the night of September 28. Campers at coastal parks were also ordered by police to find shelter on higher ground. However, the hurricane watch was discontinued after Narda veered away on September 29. Meanwhile, gale warnings and high surf advisories were dropped that day for all islands except for the Big Island. The outer rainbands of Narda brought locally heavy rain to the state. Flooding was reported of eastern areas of the Big Island. Nine families were evacuated to shelters. Higher than normal surf was also observed on southeast and east facing beaches. Overall, damage from Narda was minor.

=== Tropical Storm Octave ===
- Tropical storm (SSHWS)
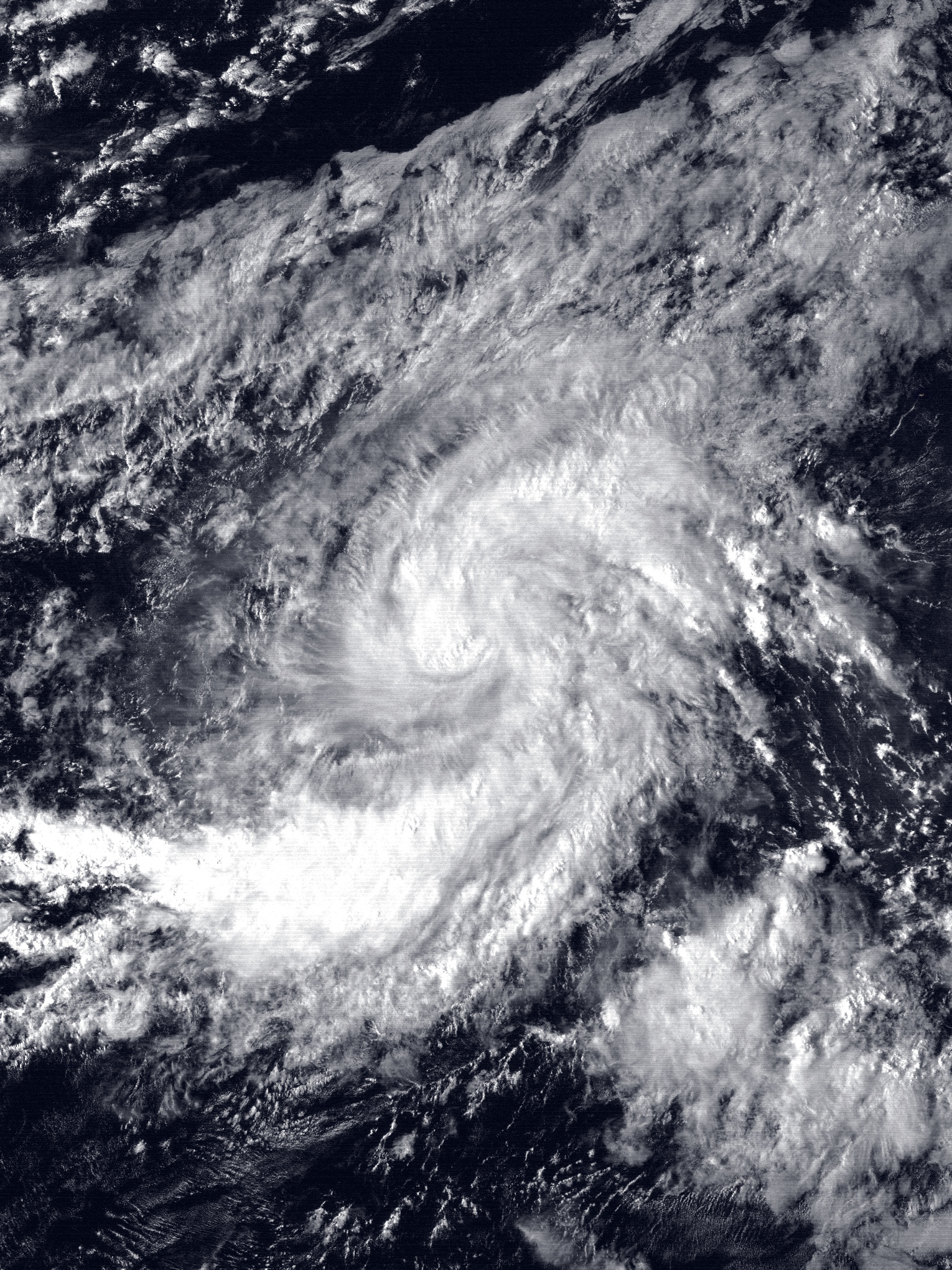
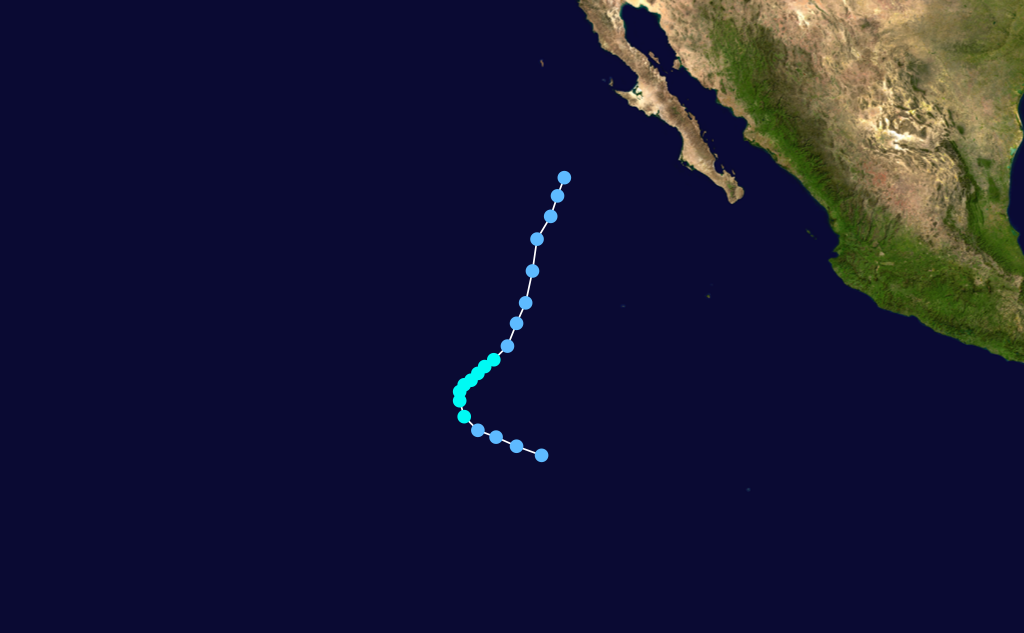
- Duration: September 27 – October 2
- Peak intensity: 50 mph (85 km/h) (1-min);

A tropical disturbance formed south of the Gulf of Tehuantepec on September 23, which moved west for four days prior to attaining tropical depression status. Initially, the depression was situated over warm waters; however, wind shear subsequently increased in the vicinity of the storm. However, on September 28, the depression strengthened into Tropical Storm Octave. Six hours later, Octave attained its peak intensity of 45 mph (70 km/h) and decreased in forward speed while turning to the northeast. On September 30, began to weaken due to cooler waters and increasing vertical wind shear. At 1200 UTC on October 2, the EPHC issued their last advisory on the storm, as the surface circulation had dissipated.

Due to the threat for flooding, local flood warnings were issued for much of Arizona. In the end, the highest rainfall associated with Octave was 12.0 in (300 mm) at Mount Graham. Throughout the state, excessive rainfall caused many rivers to overflow. The Santa Cruz, Rillito, and Gila rivers experienced their highest crests on record. Runoff from both the Rillito and Santa Cruz rivers flooded Marana. Major flooding was reported along the Gila River, and two of its tributaries, the San Francisco River and the San Pedro River. These rains devastated Clifton along the San Francisco River valley. Over 700 homes were destroyed in Clifton. Further south along the Gila River, major flooding was reported in extreme southeastern Arizona. Willcox was nearly flooded. Further west, in Phoenix, 150 people were evacuated from an apartment complex. Throughout the greater Phoenix area, eight fires were started via lighting.

Tropical Storm Octave was considered the worst flood in Pima County history. Octave is also regarded as the worst tropical system to affect Arizona. Around 3,000 buildings were damaged due to Octave. A total of 853 structures were destroyed by Octave while 2,052 others were damaged. About 10,000 people were temporarily displaced. Damage in Arizona totaled $500 million. Fourteen people drowned and 975 persons were injured. Elsewhere, in New Mexico, a peak total of 5.42 in (138 mm) of rain was recorded, resulting in flooding. New Mexico governor Toney Anaya declared a state of emergency in Catron County. Damage in New Mexico was estimated at $12.5 million. In Mexico, 12 in (300 mm) of rain was reported in Altar. In Sonora, many roads were closed. On October 3, Arizona Governor Bruce Babbitt declared a state of emergency. President Ronald Reagan declared eight Arizona counties a "major disaster area" on October 5.

=== Hurricane Priscilla ===
- Category 3 hurricane (SSHWS)
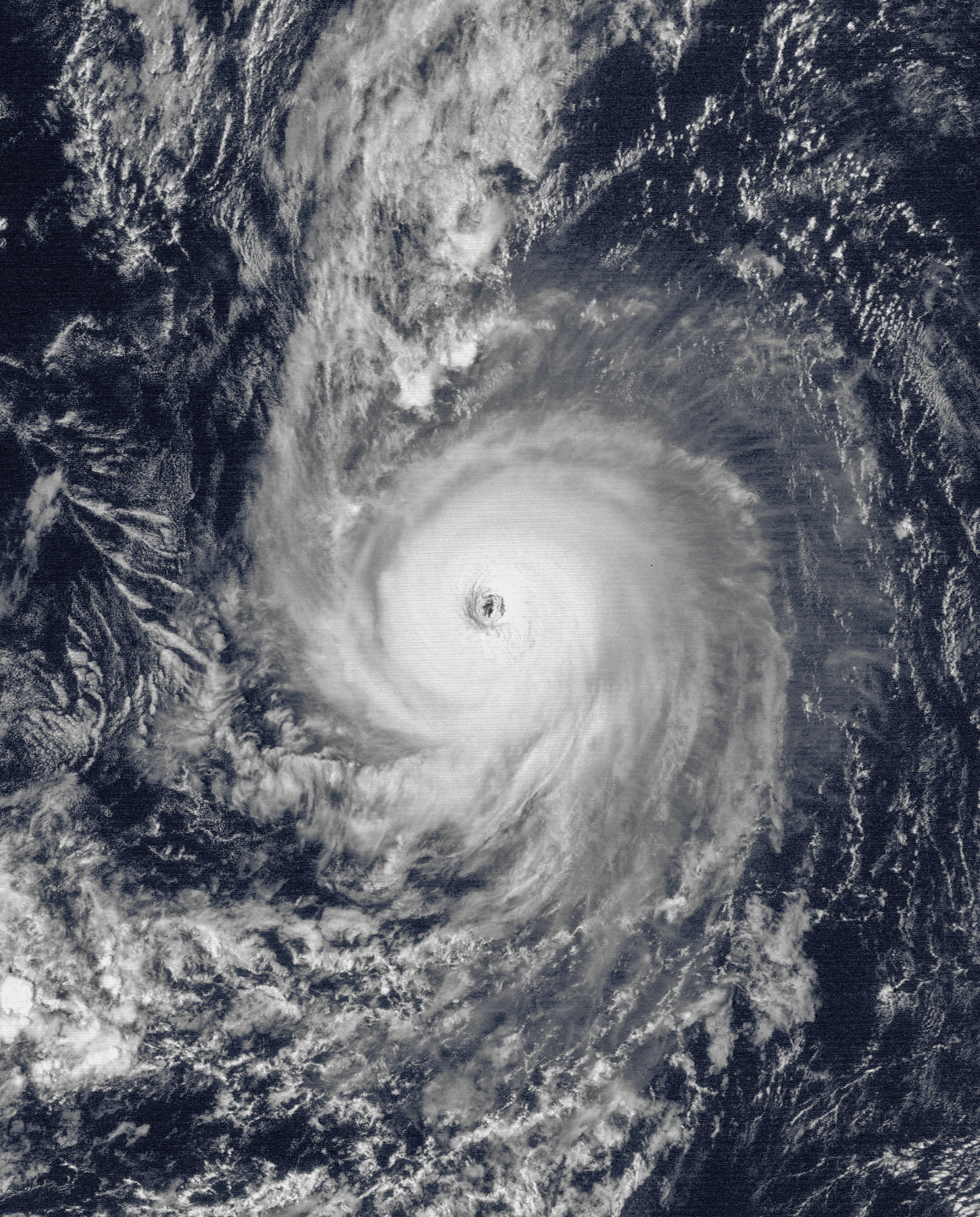
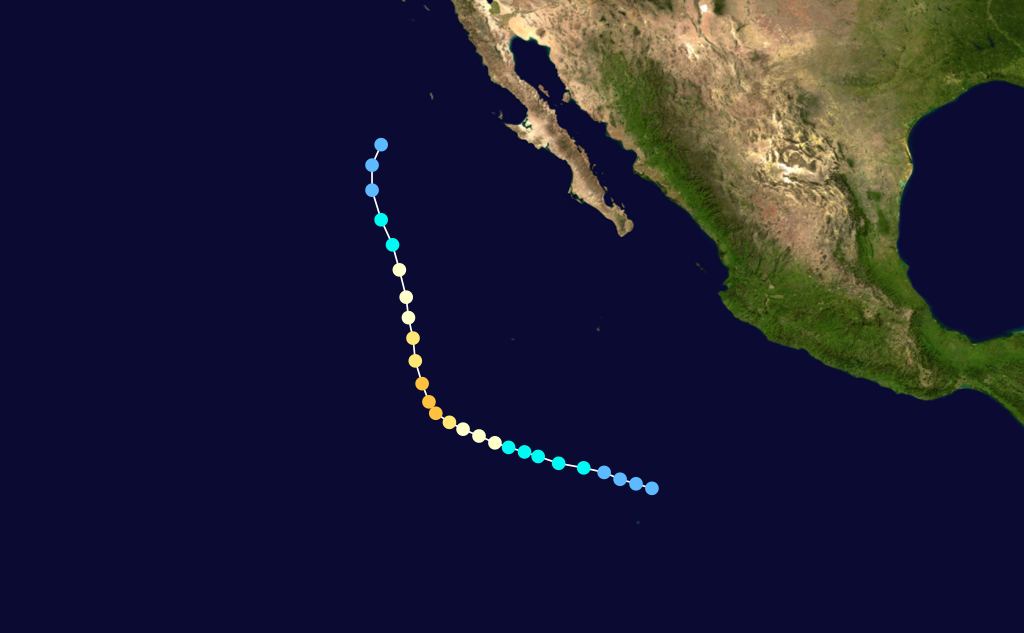
- Duration: September 30 – October 7
- Peak intensity: 115 mph (185 km/h) (1-min);

While Tropical Storm Octave was still active, a tropical disturbance formed on September 29 near Clipperton Island. The disturbance moved northwest, and was upgraded into a depression at 1800 UTC. While moving beneath the southwest side of a ridge, Priscilla steadily intensified. Early on October 3, Priscilla was upgraded into a hurricane. After remaining a Category 1 hurricane for most of the day, it was upgraded into a Category 2 hurricane that evening, and subsequently, began to rapidly intensify. At 0000 UTC on October 4, about 24 hours after first becoming a hurricane, Priscilla was upgraded into a major hurricane, with winds of 115 mph (185 km/h). While at peak, which it held on for 12 hours, Priscilla displayed a well-defined eye. Additionally, the hurricane began a sharp turn to the north-northwest due to a strong trough off the Southern California coast and the storm was initially expected to move onshore Baja California and bring flooding rains to Arizona.

Shortly after its peak, Priscilla began to encounter cooler waters and thus it start to slowly lose strength. During the pre-dawn hours of October 5, Priscilla weakened into a Category 2. Later that day, it was downgraded into a Category 1 system. By 0000 UTC on October 6, the EPHC downgraded the system into a tropical storm. By this time, it was anticipated that the system would make landfall as a tropical system on California. Quickly weakening, Priscilla was downgraded into a depression that day. Early on October 7, Priscilla dissipated about 150 mi (240 km) southwest of Guadalupe Island.

Due to the storm's threat to California, flash flood watches were issued for much of the southern portion of the state. In Arizona, heavy equipment was evacuated from flood-prone areas. Along the central Baja California peninsula, showers were reported. While still a Category 2 hurricane, the outer rainbands of Priscilla brought rains to California, resulting in power outages, hail, and traffic accidents. In Los Angeles, a daily rainfall record was set. Some streets in Anaheim and Santa Ana were flooded. The roof of a church was also damaged. Consequently, flash flood warnings were posted for parts of Los Angeles, Riverside, and San Bernardino Counties. Offshore, rough seas were generated. Across northwestern Arizona and Nevada, heavy showers and thunderstorms occurred. The remnants of the storm moved over the area on October 7. Rainfall totals were less than expected and most weather stations recorded less than .1 in (5 mm) of precipitation. A peak total of .35 in (8.9 mm) was measured in Ely.

=== Hurricane Raymond ===
- Category 4 hurricane (SSHWS)
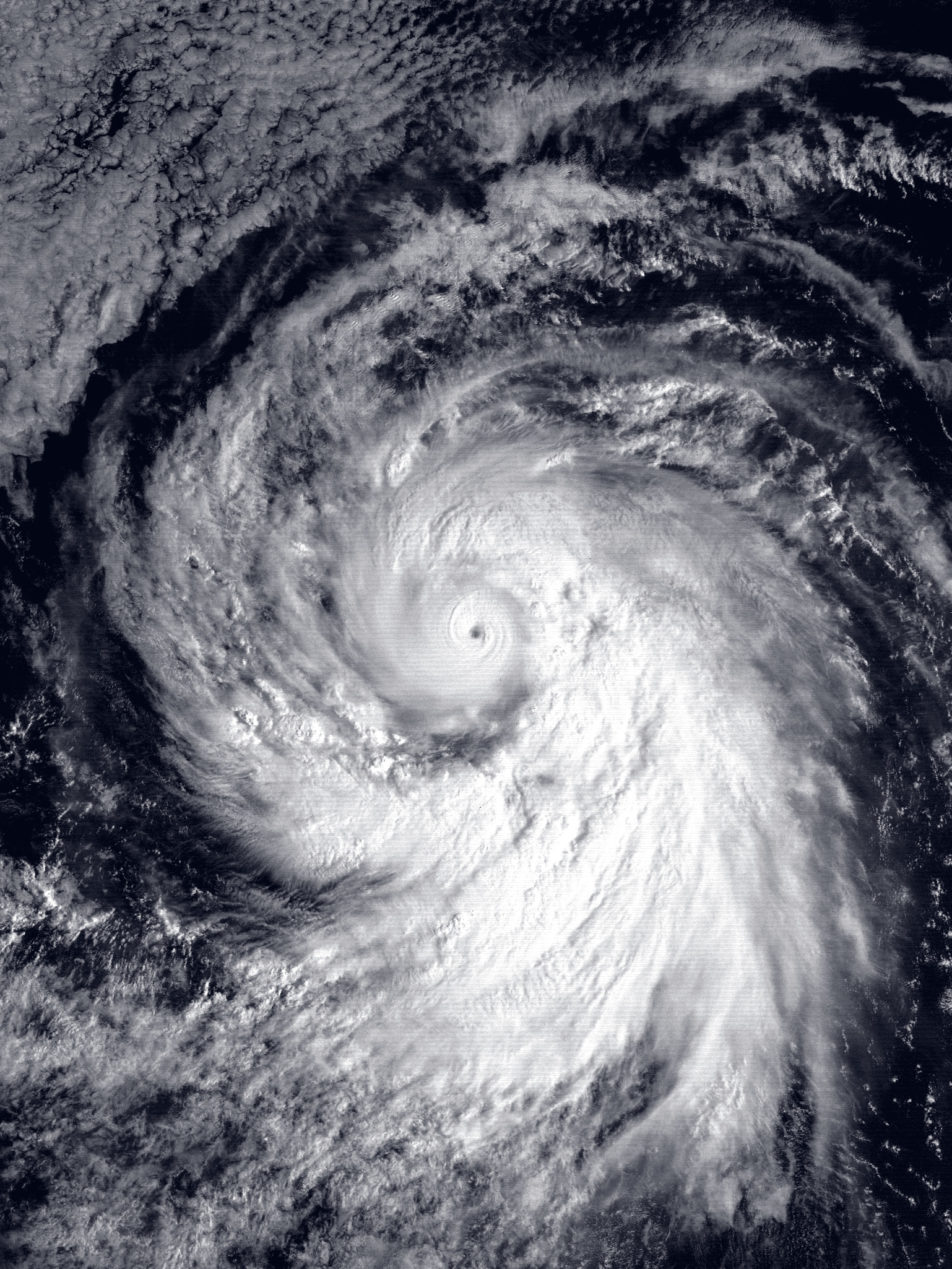
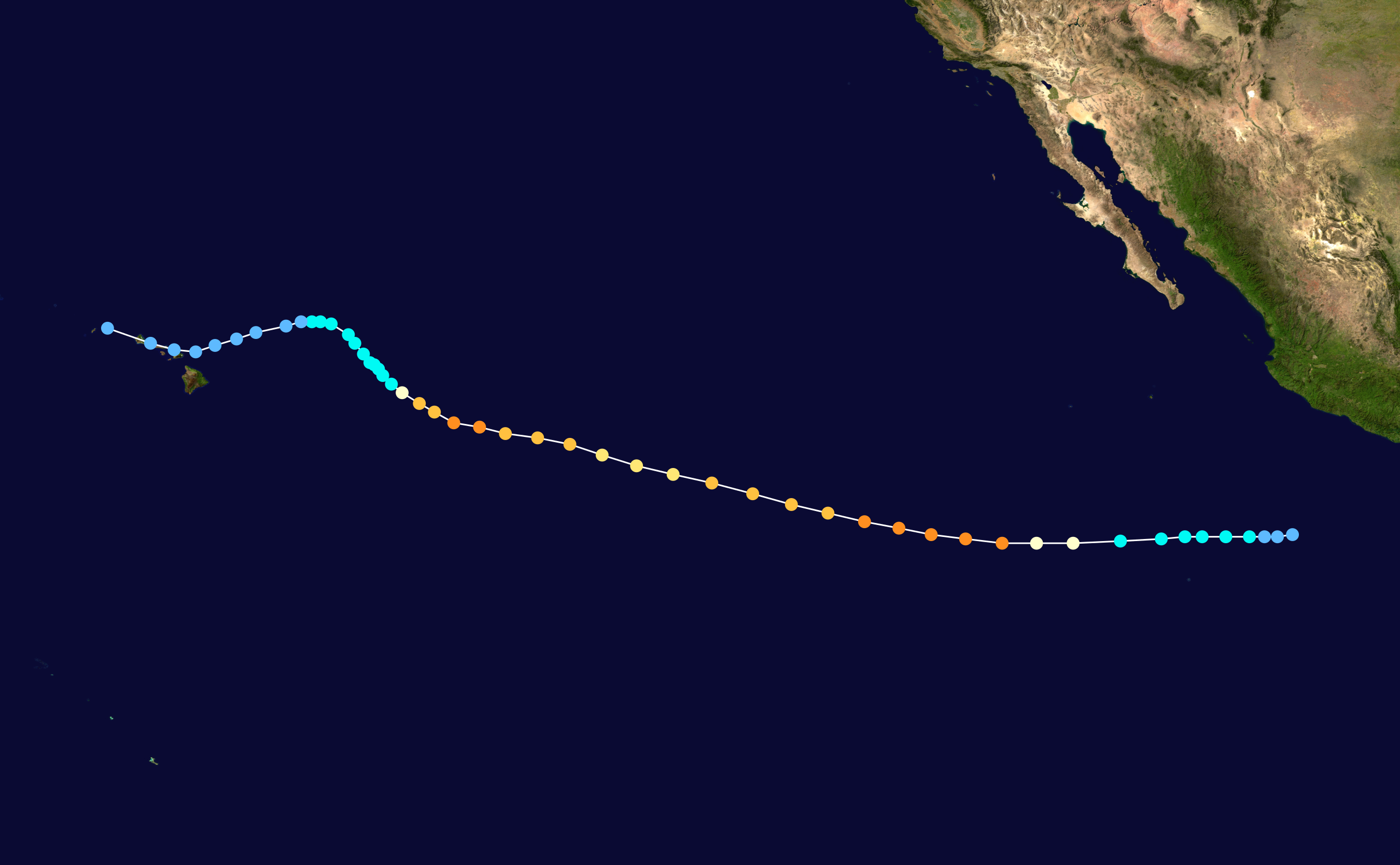
- Duration: October 8 – October 20
- Peak intensity: 145 mph (230 km/h) (1-min);

A tropical wave crossed Nicaragua on October 5, moving westward. A ridge center was over Mexico and a well-developed ridge extended westward towards the Hawaiian Islands. Despite the presence of strong wind shear, it was upgraded to a tropical depression 764 mi (1,230 km) south-southeast of Cabo San Lucas on October 8. The depression moved over 84 to 86 °F (29 to 30 °C) waters, intensifying into Tropical Storm Raymond on October 9. Intensifying quickly, Raymond attained hurricane status on October 10. Hurricane Raymond subsequently developed a small but distinct eye. Rapidly intensifying, the storm rapidly moved west. Raymond was upgraded into a major hurricane late on October 10. Raymond reached its peak winds of 145 mph (235 km/h) as a moderate Category 4 hurricane roughly 24 hours after becoming a hurricane. At the time of its peak, the hurricane was located about 800 mi (1,285 km) south of San Diego. Raymond is believed to have held on to peak intensity for almost two days.

The hurricane subsequently weakened and was only a Category 2 by October 13, but it re-intensified over the next few days. With continued warm waters, the system crossed into the CPHC warning zone, reaching a secondary peak of 140 mph (230 km/h) on October 14 while becoming one of the strongest storms ever recorded in the region. By then, Raymond had begun a movement to the northwest. The eye later became poorly defined while the symmetric shape of the hurricane became elongated. The Hurricane Hunters confirmed the weakening trend, reporting a pressure of 968 mbar (28.6 inHg). Hurricane Raymond weakened to a tropical storm on October 16 as wind shear took its toll on the storm. Meanwhile, the storm drifted northwest and underwent several loops. Two days later the storm resumed its westward motion as it weakened to a tropical depression. It became devoid of deep convection, and made landfall on Molokai on October 20 while still tropical depression. Shortly thereafter, Raymond dissipated inland.

Because meteorologists were predicting that the storm may pose a threat to the Hawaiian island group, the CPHC issued a hurricane watch for Hawaii. A high-surf advisory also was issued. As Raymond approached Hawaii, the cyclone kicked up very high surfs that pounded the big island. On the east end of the Hawaiian Island chain was battered by 10–15 ft (3.0–4.6 m) waves. In addition, Raymond brought beneficial rains and gusty winds on all islands. Precipitation ranged from 1 to 2 in (25 to 51 mm) on Maui. There was one fatality when a sailor, Richard Sharp, was killed overboard off the 44-foot (13 m) yacht Hazaña; the boat, which was dismasted, was also occupied by his girlfriend, Tami Oldham Ashcraft, from Tahiti to San Diego, but the course was altered to Hawaii because of the storm.

=== Tropical Storm Sonia ===
- Tropical storm (SSHWS)
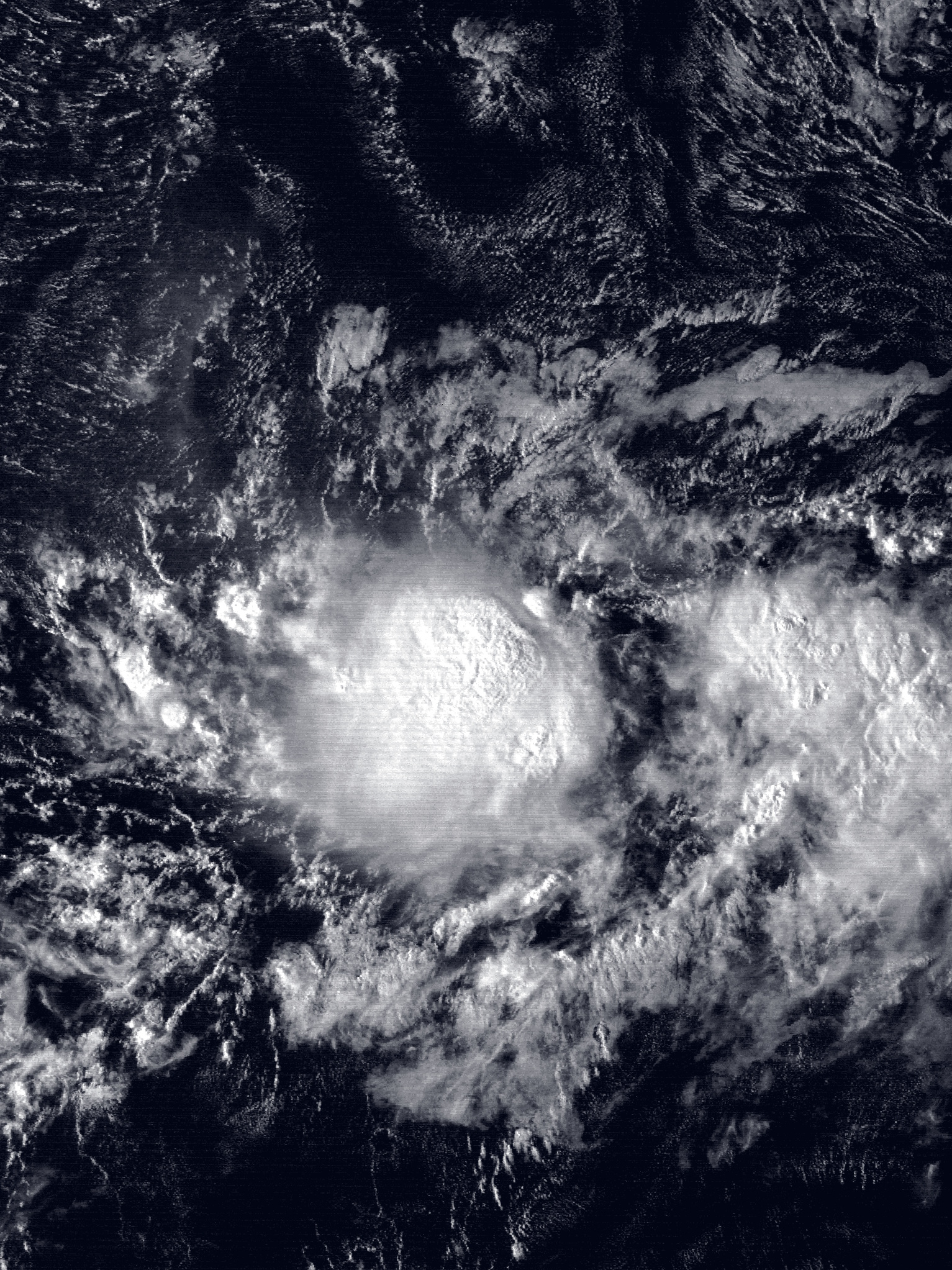
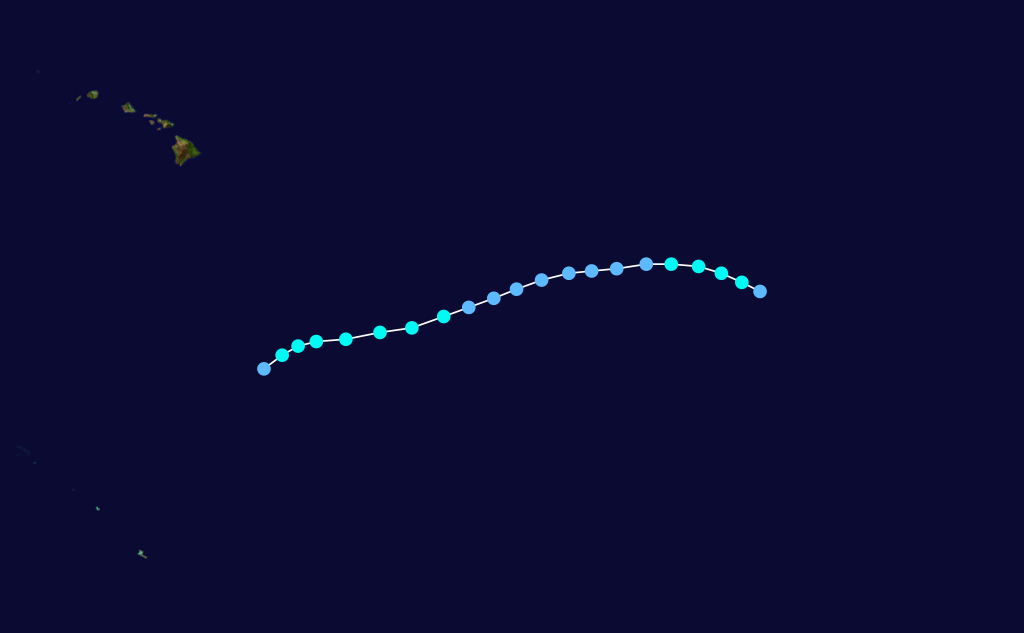
- Duration: October 9 – October 14
- Peak intensity: 45 mph (75 km/h) (1-min);

Situated several hundred miles west of Hurricane Raymond, a tropical disturbance formed on October 8. Moving west-northwest, the disturbance was upgraded into a tropical depression on October 9. After moving west-northwest for 12 hours, it turned west. Despite warm waters, strong westerly wind shear prevented much further development. On October 10, the EPHC upgraded Sonia into a tropical storm. That day, Sonia reached its peak intensity of 45 mph (70 km/h). However, this was short-lived as the thunderstorm activity quickly became displaced from the center. At 0000 UTC on October 11, Sonia weakened into a tropical depression. About 24 hours later, Sonia weakened into a tropical disturbance after it failed to maintain a closed circulation. Thereafter, the storm entered the CPHC's warning zone, where it began to encounter warmer waters and lighter wind shear, and thus began to deepen. On October 13, Sonia regained tropical storm intensity and briefly posed a threat to Hawaii. Despite remaining small and disorganized, Sonia reached its peak intensity of 45 mph (70 km/h) for a second time that evening. However, outflow from Hurricane Raymond weakened the system and Sonia dissipated on October 14 over 1,000 miles (1,610 km) south-southeast of the Big Island.

=== Hurricane Tico ===
- Category 4 hurricane (SSHWS)
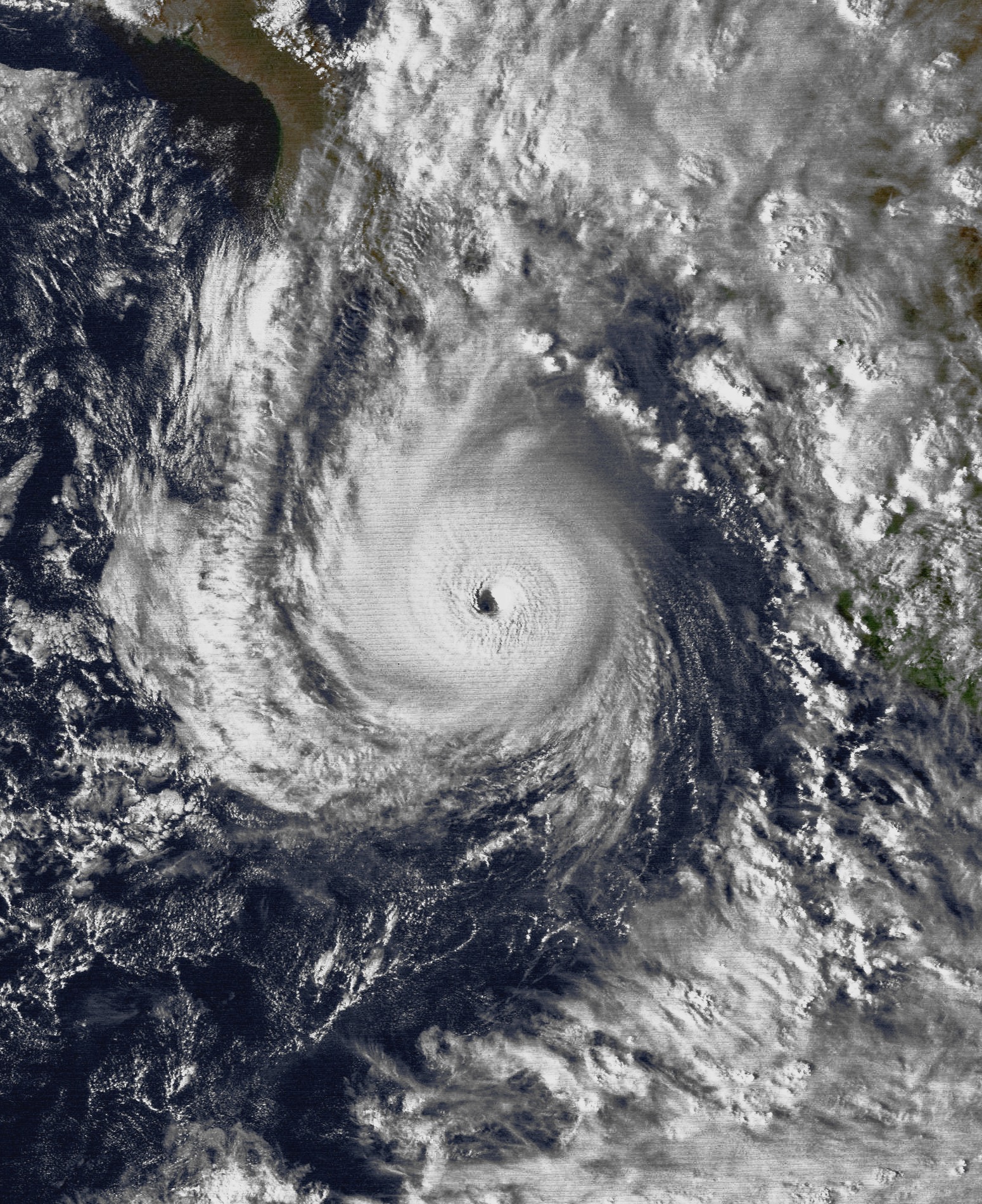
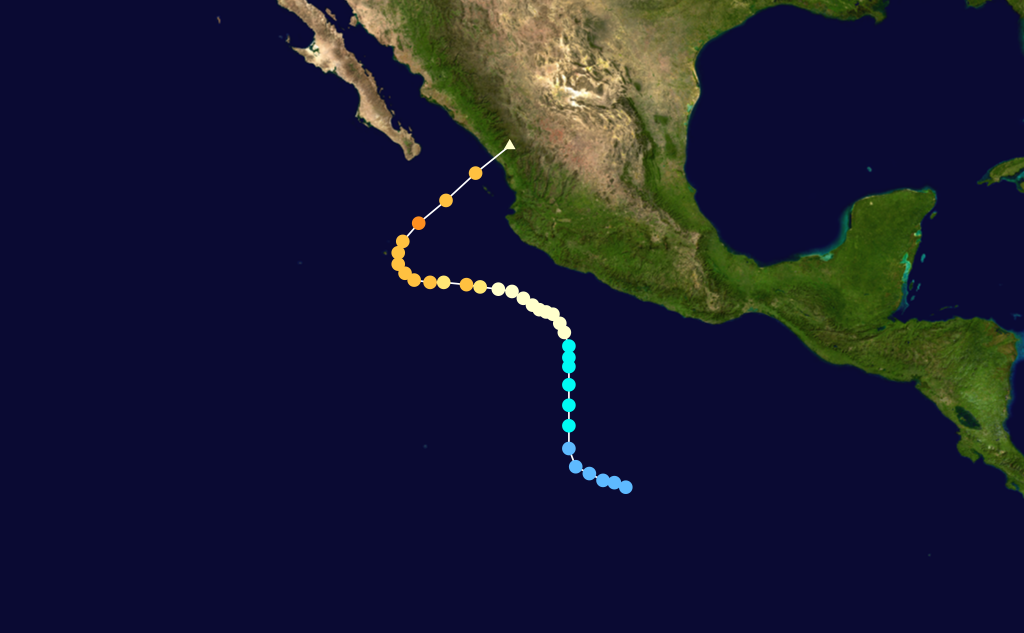
- Duration: October 11 – October 19
- Peak intensity: 130 mph (215 km/h) (1-min);

The origins of Hurricane Tico were from a weak tropical disturbance that crossed Costa Rica into the Pacific Ocean on October 7. Over warm waters, the system was sufficiently organized to be declared Tropical Depression Twenty-One on October 11, about 575 mi (925 km) south of Acapulco. On October 12 it turned sharply northward; the depression was upgraded to Tropical Storm Tico on October 13. Tropical Storm Tico continued to intensify. Two days after becoming a tropical storm, Tico strengthened further to attain hurricane status. By October 16, Tico had reached major hurricane status. Early on October 19, it reached peak winds of 130 mph (215 km/h). It weakened slightly as it approached the coast, and at about 1500 UTC that day Tico made landfall near Mazatlán with winds of 125 mph (205 km/h). It rapidly weakened over land and merged with a cold front. The remnants of Tico were last observed on October 24 over Ohio.

Moderate rainfall was reported around the landfall location, peaking at 8.98 in (228 mm) in Pueblo Nuevo, Durango; lighter precipitation of 1–3 in (25–75 mm) occurred further inland toward the Mexico/United States border. Two 328 ft (100 m) anchored ships were washed aground by strong waves and swells, with a total of seven ships reported missing. Overall, the hurricane sank nine small ships, and nine fishermen were killed. Hurricane Tico was responsible severe flooding and heavy damage due to strong winds. Throughout the state of Sinaloa, the hurricane destroyed nearly 19,000 acres (77 km^{2}) of bean and corn, although most of the agricultural damage occurred south of Mazatlán. In addition, the hurricane disrupted the flow of drinking water. A total of 13 hotels received extensive damage and 14 people were hurt. Twenty-five thousand people were left homeless and damage throughout the country was estimated at $200 million (1983 USD). Hurricane Tico caused a total of 135 deaths in Mexico.

Rain from Tico continued into the South-Central United States; serious flooding was reported along the lower Washita River. Across Guthire, 5% of the town's population, sought three emergency shelter due to 7 ft (2.1 m) deep water. Throughout Oklahoma and Texas, 200 people were displaced and six people were killed. A total of $77 million in crop damage occurred in Oklahoma. Total damage in the state was estimated at $84 million. Elsewhere, one person was killed in the Kansas.

=== Tropical Depression Twenty-Two-E ===
- Tropical depression (SSHWS)
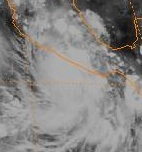
- Duration: October 18 – October 18
- Peak intensity: 35 mph (55 km/h) (1-min);

On October 18, a tropical disturbance was noted about 300 mi (485 km) south of the Gulf of Tehuantepec. Moving west-northwest, the disturbance was upgraded into a depression. After turning northwest, the depression dissipated an hour before moving ashore. Lasting less than 24 hours, Twenty-Two-E was the shortest-lived cyclone of the season. Despite the lack of damage, 10 in (250 mm) of rain was measured along portions of the Southern Mexico coast due to the depression.

=== Tropical Storm Velma ===
- Tropical storm (SSHWS)
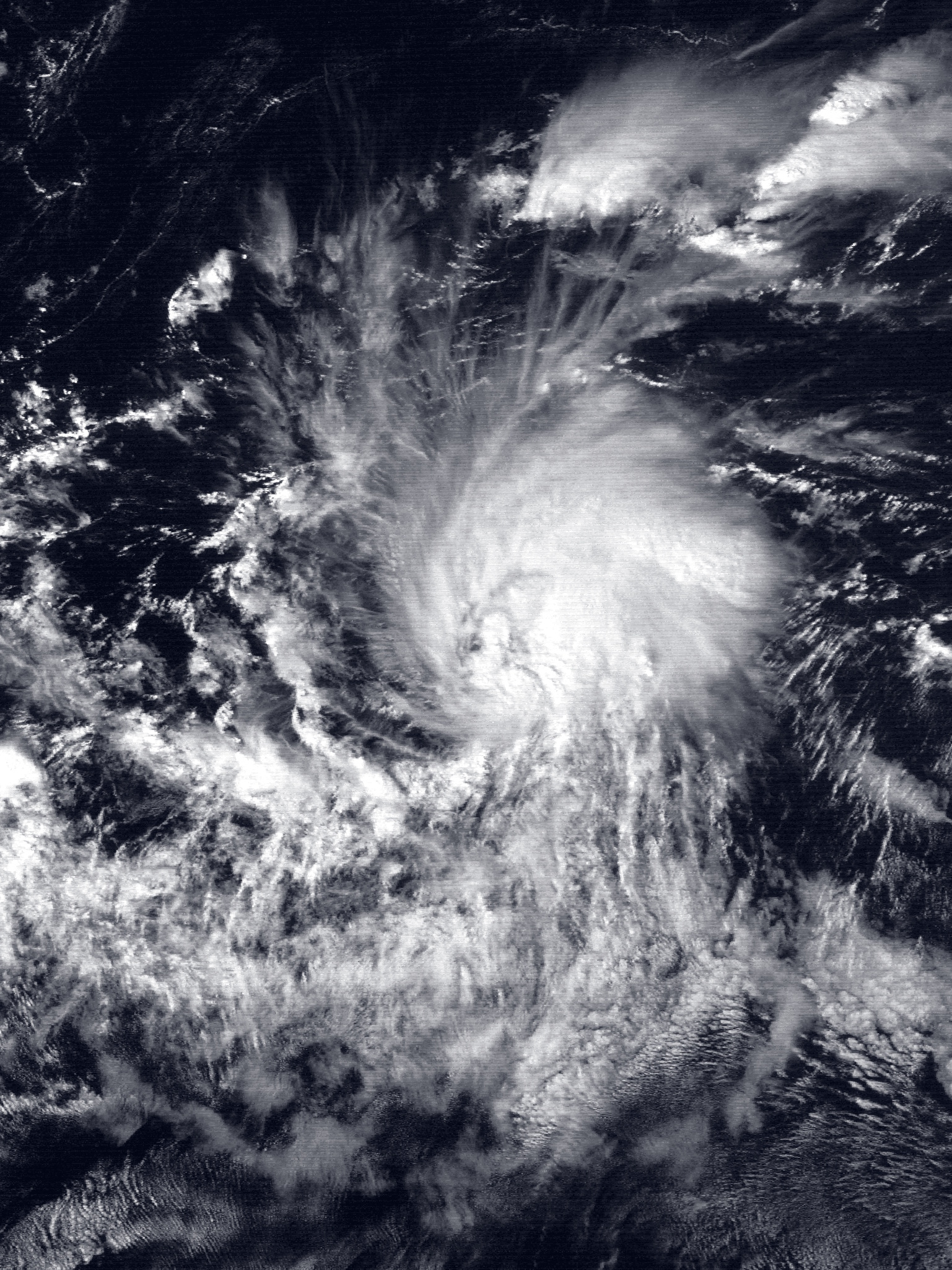
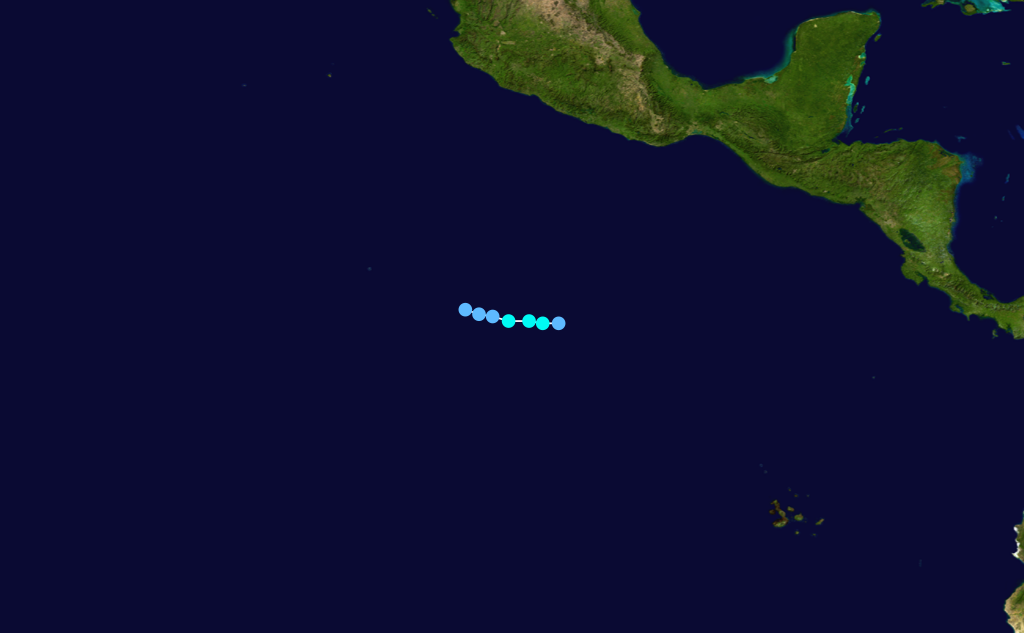
- Duration: November 1 – November 3
- Peak intensity: 40 mph (65 km/h) (1-min);

A tropical disturbance developed within the ITCZ during October 31. Despite unfavorable conditions, the system began to organize, and became Tropical Depression Twenty-Three on November 1. It quickly intensified, and was upgraded to Tropical Storm Velma six hours later. No further intensification occurred; Velma peaked as a minimal tropical storm. The tropical storm began to weaken after 18 hours, and was downgraded to a tropical depression on November 2. The following day, the EPHC issued the final advisory on Tropical Depression Velma.

=== Hurricane Winnie ===
- Category 1 hurricane (SSHWS)
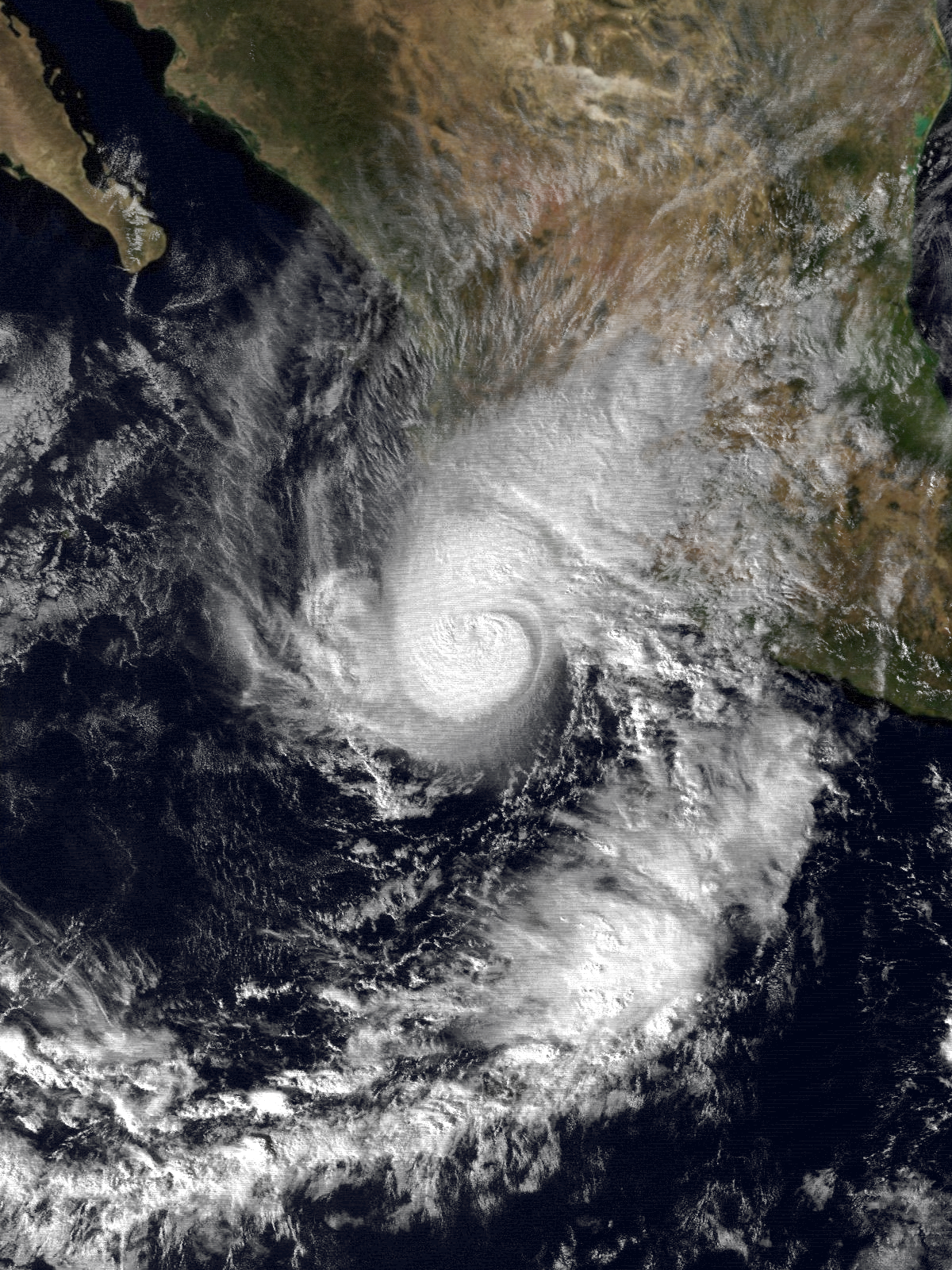
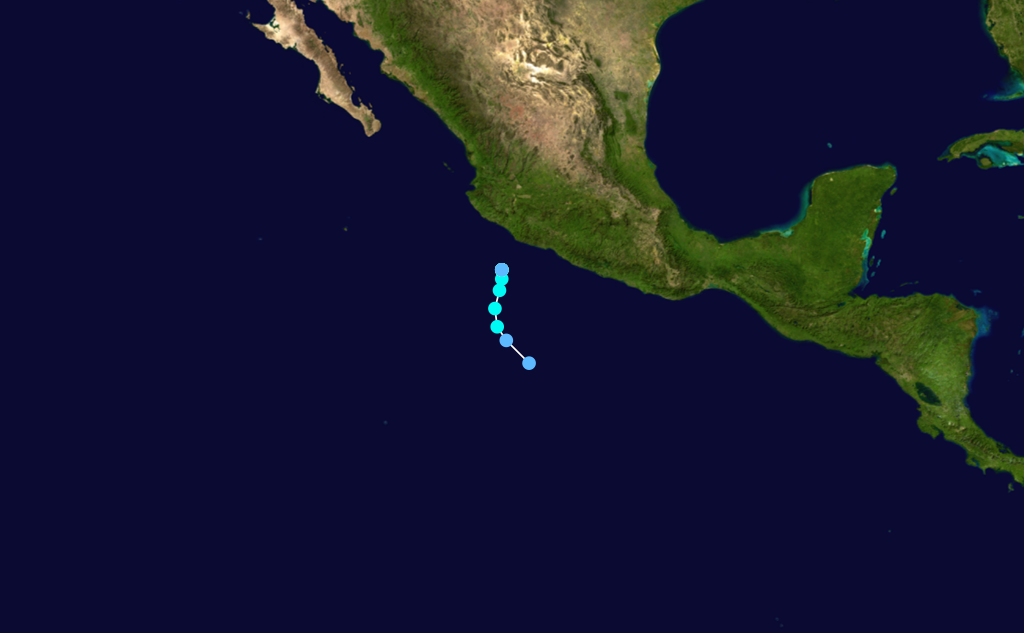
- Duration: December 4 – December 7
- Peak intensity: 90 mph (150 km/h) (1-min);

Due to a combination of unusually warm sea surface temperatures and the displacement of the ITCZ to north, a small area of disturbed weather formed in early December. Situated south-southwest of Acapulco, the disturbance organized into a tropical depression on December 4. It slowly headed north, and intensified into a tropical storm. Winnie peaked in intensity on December 6, and became the strongest Pacific hurricane in December since records began. Initially expected to continue north, the storm stalled instead. Due to wind shear caused by a trough, Winnie began to rapidly deteriorate, and it was downgraded into a tropical storm that night. After weakening further into a depression, Winnie dissipated on December 7. Its remnant disturbance then moved west. Winnie was an out of season storm, and is the only known December tropical cyclone in the east Pacific proper since the modern record began in 1949. Winnie is the latest hurricane on record in the eastern North Pacific.

Although the tropical cyclone never made landfall, it caused rain in parts of Mexico. The highest total of 3.6 in (91 mm) was recorded in Caleta de Campos. Furthermore, the storm brought strong winds to the region, but damage was less than expected.

== Storm names ==
The following list of names was used for named storms that formed in the North Pacific Ocean east of 140°W in 1983. This was a new set of names, and every name used this season was used for the first time, except for Priscilla, which was previously used in the old four-year lists. All 21 names on the list were used. No names were retired from this list following the season, and it was next used (expanded to include "X", "Y", and "Z" names) for the 1989 season.

- Adolph
- Barbara
- Cosme
- Dalilia
- Erick
- Flossie
- Gil *
- Henriette
- Ismael
- Juliette
- Kiko
- Lorena
- Manuel
- Narda *
- Octave
- Priscilla
- Raymond *
- Sonia *
- Tico
- Velma
- Winnie

For storms that form in the North Pacific from 140°W to the International Date Line, the names come from a series of four rotating lists. Names are used one after the other without regard to year, and when the bottom of one list is reached, the next named storm receives the name at the top of the next list. No named storms formed in the central North Pacific in 1983. Named storms in the table above that crossed into the area during the year are noted (*).

== Season effects ==
This is a table of all of the storms that have formed in the 1983 Pacific hurricane season. It includes their name, duration, peak classification and intensities, areas affected, damage, and death totals. Deaths in parentheses are additional and indirect (an example of an indirect death would be a traffic accident), but were still related to that storm. Damage and deaths include totals while the storm was extratropical, a wave, or a low, and all of the damage figures are in 1983 USD.

Saffir–Simpson scale
TD	TS	C1	C2	C3	C4	C5

1983 Pacific hurricane season statistics
Storm name	Dates active	Storm category at peak intensity	Max 1-min wind mph (km/h)	Min. press. (mbar)	Areas affected	Damage (US$)	Deaths	Ref(s).
Adolph	May 21-26	Category 2 hurricane	110 (175)	Unknown	Puerto Vallarta, Mazatlan	None	None	
Barbara	June 9-18	Category 4 hurricane	130 (215)	Unknown	None	None	None	
Cosme	July 2-5	Tropical storm	40 (65)	Unknown	None	None	None	
Dalilia	July 5-12	Tropical storm	70 (110)	Unknown	None	None	None	
Erick	July 12-16	Tropical storm	65 (100)	Unknown	None	None	None	
Flossie	July 17-21	Tropical storm	60 (95)	Unknown	Western Mexico	None	None	
Gil	July 23-August 5	Category 1 hurricane	90 (150)	Unknown	Hawaii	Minimal	1	
Henriette	July 27-August 6	Category 4 hurricane	130 (215)	Unknown	None	Minimal	None	
Nine-E	August 3-7	Tropical depression	35 (55)	Unknown	None	Minimal	None	
Ismael	August 8-14	Category 2 hurricane	100 (155)	Unknown	California, Nevada	$19 million	4 (1)	
Eleven-E	August 19-20	Tropical depression	35 (55)	Unknown	None	None	None	
One-C	August 15-16	Tropical depression	35 (55)	Unknown	None	None	None	
Juliette	August 24-September 1	Tropical storm	60 (95)	Unknown	None	None	None	
Two-C	August 31-September 1	Tropical depression	35 (55)	Unknown	None	None	None	
Kiko	August 31-September 9	Category 4 hurricane	145 (230)	Unknown	Western Mexico	None	None	
Lorena	September 6-14	Category 3 hurricane	115 (185)	Unknown	Acapulco	$33,000	7	
Manuel	September 12-20	Category 3 hurricane	115 (185)	Unknown	California	None	None	
Narda	September 21-October 1	Tropical storm	70 (110)	Unknown	Hawaii	None	None	
Octave	September 27-October 2	Tropical storm	50 (85)	Unknown	Western Mexico, Southwest United States	$513 million	14	
Priscilla	September 30-October 7	Category 3 hurricane	115 (185)	Unknown	Western Mexico	None	None	
Raymond	October 8-20	Category 4 hurricane	145 (230)	Unknown	Hawaii	Minimal	1	
Sonia	October 9-14	Tropical storm	45 (65)	Unknown	None	None	None	
Tico	October 11-19	Category 4 hurricane	130 (215)	Unknown	Mazatlan	$284 million	141	
Twenty-Two-E	October 18	Tropical depression	35 (55)	Unknown	None	Unknown	None	
Velma	November 1-3	Tropical storm	40 (65)	Unknown	None	None	None	
Winnie	December 4-7	Category 1 hurricane	90 (150)	Unknown	Mexico	None	None	
Season aggregates
26 systems	May 21 – December 7		145 (230)	Unknown		$816.33 Million	168	

== See also ==
- List of Pacific hurricanes
- Pacific hurricane season
- 1983 Atlantic hurricane season
- 1983 Pacific typhoon season
- 1983 North Indian Ocean cyclone season
- Australian cyclone seasons: 1982–83, 1983–84
- South Pacific cyclone seasons: 1982–83, 1983–84
- South-West Indian Ocean cyclone seasons: 1982–83, 1983–84
