= Timeline of the 1990 Pacific hurricane season =

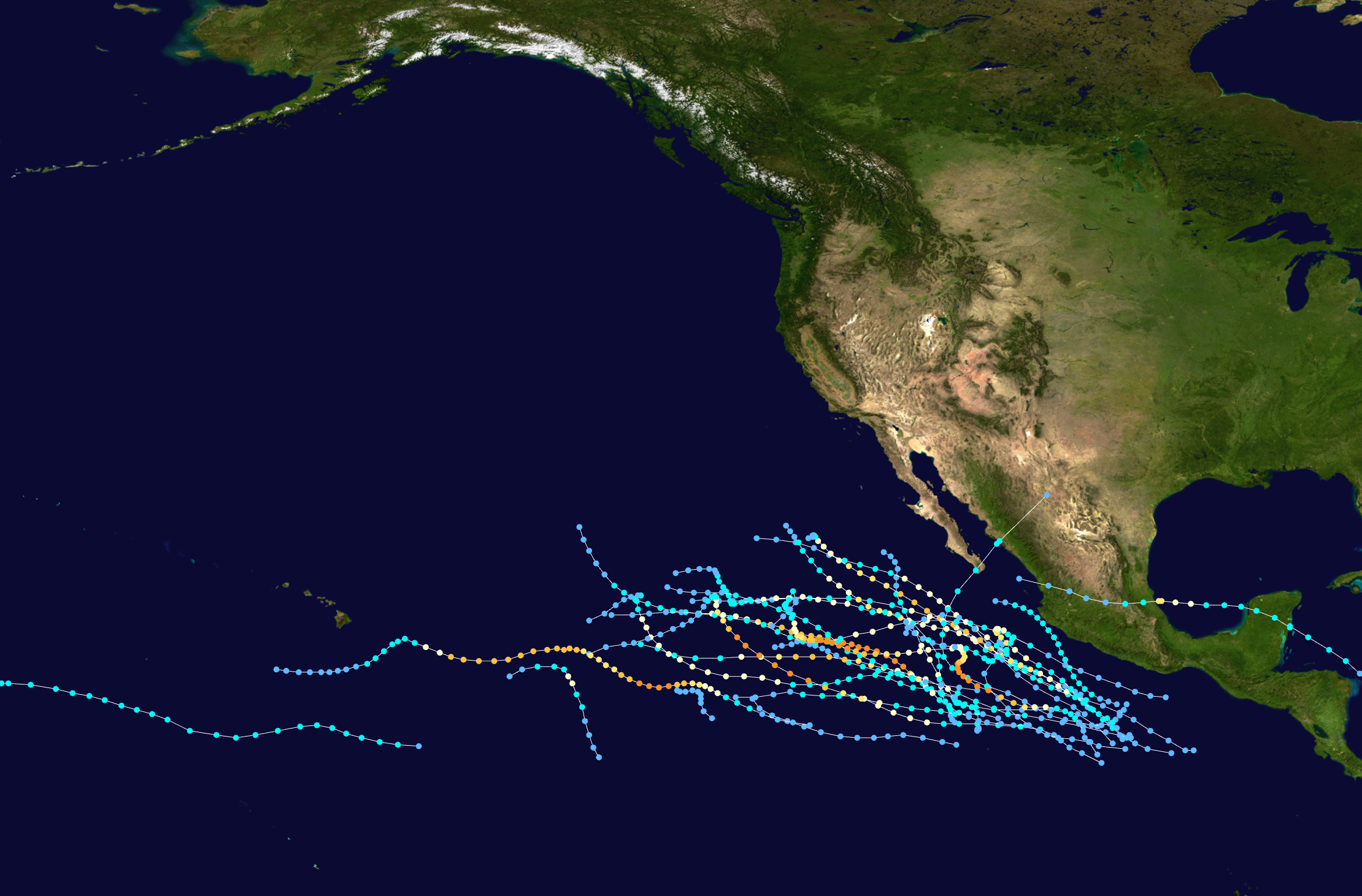
- Season summary map

Season boundaries
- First system formed: May 12, 1990
- Last system dissipated: November 1, 1990

Strongest system
- Name: Trudy
- Maximum winds: 155 mph (250 km/h) (1-minute sustained)
- Lowest pressure: 924 mbar (hPa; 27.29 inHg)

Longest lasting system
- Name: Trudy
- Duration: 16.75 days
Storm articles
- Hurricane Diana
- Tropical Storm Rachel (1990)

The 1990 Pacific hurricane season was the annual cycle of tropical cyclone formation over the Pacific Ocean north of the equator and east of the International Date Line (IDL). The season officially began on May 15 in the Eastern Pacific basin proper (east of 140°W) and June 1 in the Central Pacific basin (140°W to the IDL), and ended on November 30 in both areas. This is historically the period during which most tropical cyclogenesis occurs in these respective areas. Activity during the season began three days early with the formation of Hurricane Alma on May 12. The final system to dissipate was Hurricane Trudy, which did so on November 1. Hurricane Vance formed a few days after Trudy, but dissipated roughly a day prior.

The 1990 season was extremely active, (Note: During the period from 1981 to 2010, an average Pacific hurricane season generated 15.4 tropical storms, 8.4 hurricanes, and 3.9 major hurricanes.) producing several long-lived and powerful hurricanes. A total of 21 named tropical storms developed, of which a record-breaking 16 strengthened into hurricanes. Six became major hurricanes by reaching Category 3 or higher on the five-level Saffir–Simpson scale, including hurricanes Hernan and Trudy, which were estimated by satellite to be amongst the strongest recorded Pacific hurricanes. Four tropical cyclones existed in the Central Pacific basin during the season, including two which formed there: a tropical storm, and a tropical depression which remained below tropical storm strength. Four other such tropical depressions formed in the Eastern Pacific basin proper; a fifth—Atlantic Hurricane Diana—crossed over Mexico and emerged offshore as a tropical depression shortly before dissipation.

Despite the activity, only one tropical cyclone made landfall during the 1990 season. Tropical Storm Rachel swept across the southern Baja California peninsula and into northwestern Mexico in early October. Heavy rainfall led to floods that killed 18 people. Earlier in the season, Tropical Storm Douglas narrowly skirted the coast of Mexico, while several tropical cyclones came within close proximity of Socorro Island.

This timeline documents tropical cyclone formations, strengthening, weakening, landfalls, and dissipations during the season. It includes information that was not released during the season, meaning that data from post-storm reviews by the National Hurricane Center (NHC) and the Central Pacific Hurricane Center (CPHC) has been included.

The time stamp for each event is first stated using Coordinated Universal Time (UTC), the 24-hour clock where 00:00 = midnight UTC. The NHC uses both UTC and the time zone where the center of the tropical cyclone was then located. Prior to 2015, two time zones were utilized in the Eastern Pacific basin: Pacific for the Eastern Pacific, and Hawaii−Aleutian for the Central Pacific. In this timeline, the respective area time is included in parentheses. Additionally, figures for maximum sustained winds and position estimates are rounded to the nearest 5 units (miles, or kilometers), following NHC practice. Direct wind observations are rounded to the nearest whole number. Atmospheric pressures are listed to the nearest millibar and nearest hundredth of an inch of mercury.

== Timeline of events ==
=== May ===
May 12

- 18:00 UTC (11:00 a.m. PDT) at 9.3°N 101.1°W – An off-season tropical cyclone, Tropical Depression One-E, develops from a tropical wave while located about 575 mi (925 km) (Note: The figures for maximum sustained winds and position estimates are rounded to the nearest 5 units (knots, miles, or kilometers), following the convention used in the National Hurricane Center's operational products for each storm. All other units are rounded to the nearest digit.) south of Zihuatanejo, Guerrero.

May 14

- 00:00 UTC (5:00 p.m. PDT, May 13) at 11.7°N 105.5°W – Tropical Depression One-E strengthens into Tropical Storm Alma while located about 510 mi (825 km) south of Manzanillo, Colima.

May 15

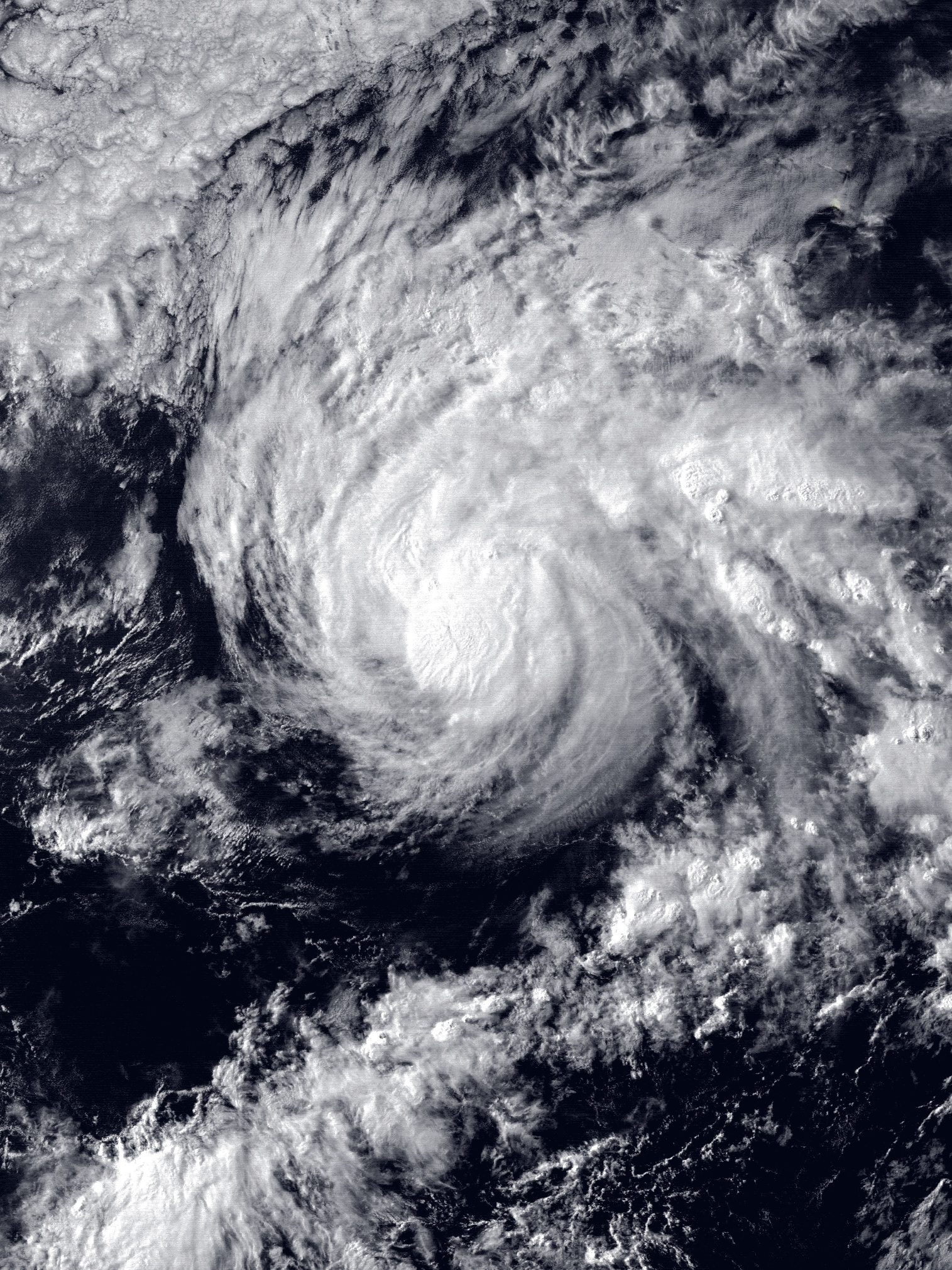
Hurricane Alma strengthening late on May 15

- The 1990 Eastern Pacific hurricane season officially begins.
- 12:00 UTC (5:00 a.m. PDT) at 12.2°N 113.6°W – Tropical Storm Alma strengthens into a Category 1 hurricane on the Saffir–Simpson scale while located about 775 mi (1,250 km) south-southwest of the southern tip of the Baja California peninsula, making it the earliest recorded hurricane in the Eastern Pacific basin proper.

May 16

- 06:00 UTC (11:00 p.m. PDT, May 15) at 13.4°N 117.1°W – Hurricane Alma attains its peak intensity, with maximum sustained winds of 85 mph (140 km/h) and a minimum central pressure of 979 mbar (28.91 inHg), while located about 805 mi (1,295 km) southwest of the southern tip of the Baja California peninsula.
- 18:00 UTC (11:00 a.m. PDT) at 14.1°N 118.9°W – Hurricane Alma weakens into a tropical storm while located about 840 mi (1,350 km) southwest of the southern tip of the Baja California peninsula.

May 17

- 18:00 UTC (11:00 a.m. PDT) at 14.4°N 123.4°W – Tropical Storm Alma weakens into a tropical depression while located about 1,055 mi (1,695 km) southwest of the southern tip of the Baja California peninsula.

May 18

- 12:00 UTC (5:00 a.m. PDT) at 14.0°N 127.3°W – Tropical Depression Alma is last noted as a tropical cyclone while located about 1,290 mi (2,075 km) west-southwest of the southern tip of the Baja California peninsula, dissipating shortly thereafter.

=== June ===
June 1

- The 1990 Central Pacific hurricane season officially begins.

June 2

- 18:00 UTC (11:00 a.m. PDT) at 10.7°N 100.3°W – Tropical Depression Two-E develops from a tropical wave while located about 425 mi (685 km) south of Acapulco, Guerrero.

June 4

- 00:00 UTC (5:00 p.m. PDT, June 3) at 13.1°N 108.8°W – Tropical Depression Two-E strengthens into Tropical Storm Boris while located about 505 mi (815 km) southwest of Manzanillo.

June 5

- 00:00 UTC (5:00 p.m. PDT, June 4) at 14.6°N 112.1°W – Tropical Storm Boris strengthens into a Category 1 hurricane while located about 585 mi (945 km) south-southwest of the southern tip of the Baja California peninsula.
- 12:00 UTC (5:00 a.m. PDT) at 16.7°N 113.4°W – Hurricane Boris attains its peak intensity, with maximum sustained winds of 90 mph (150 km/h) and a minimum central pressure of 977 mbar (28.85 inHg), while located about 485 mi (780 km) south-southwest of the southern tip of the Baja California peninsula.

June 6

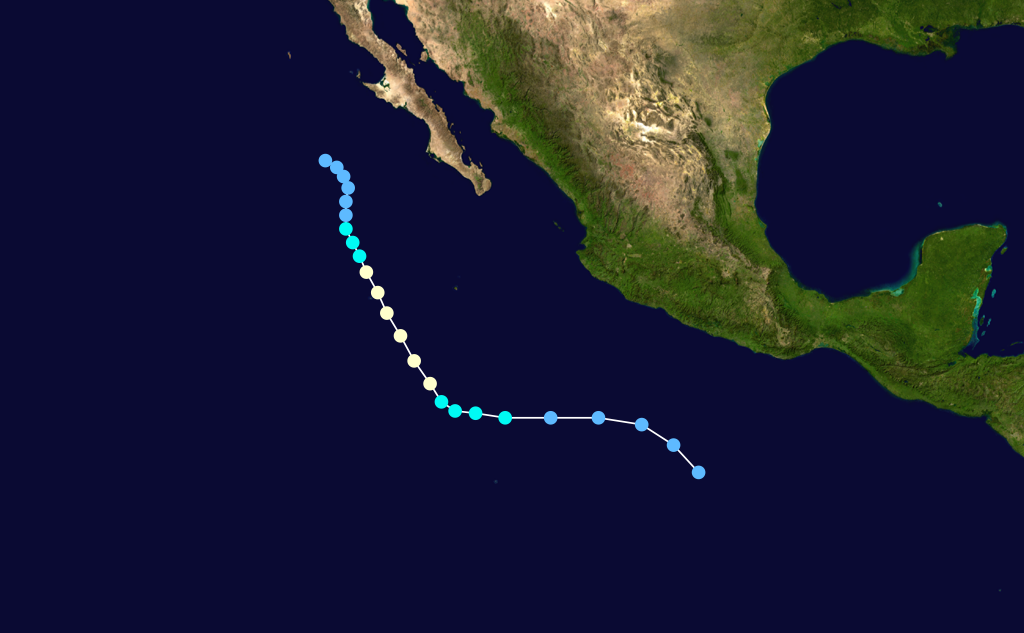
Storm track of Hurricane Boris

- 12:00 UTC (5:00 a.m. PDT) at 20.2°N 115.2°W – Hurricane Boris weakens into a tropical storm while located about 385 mi (620 km) west-southwest of the southern tip of the Baja California peninsula.

June 7

- 06:00 UTC (11:00 p.m. PDT, June 6) at 22.0°N 115.8°W – Tropical Storm Boris weakens into a tropical depression while located about 380 mi (610 km) west of the southern tip of the Baja California peninsula.

June 8

- 12:00 UTC (5:00 a.m. PDT) at 24.4°N 116.7°W – Tropical Depression Boris is last noted as a tropical cyclone while located about 260 mi (415 km) south-southwest of Punta Eugenia, Baja California Sur, dissipating shortly thereafter.
- 12:00 UTC (5:00 a.m. PDT) at 11.6°N 110.0°W – Tropical Depression Three-E develops from a tropical wave while located about 775 mi (1,250 km) south of the southern tip of the Baja California peninsula.

June 9

- 12:00 UTC (5:00 a.m. PDT) at 12.3°N 109.9°W – Tropical Depression Three-E strengthens into Tropical Storm Cristina while located about 730 mi (1,175 km) south of the southern tip of the Baja California peninsula.

June 12

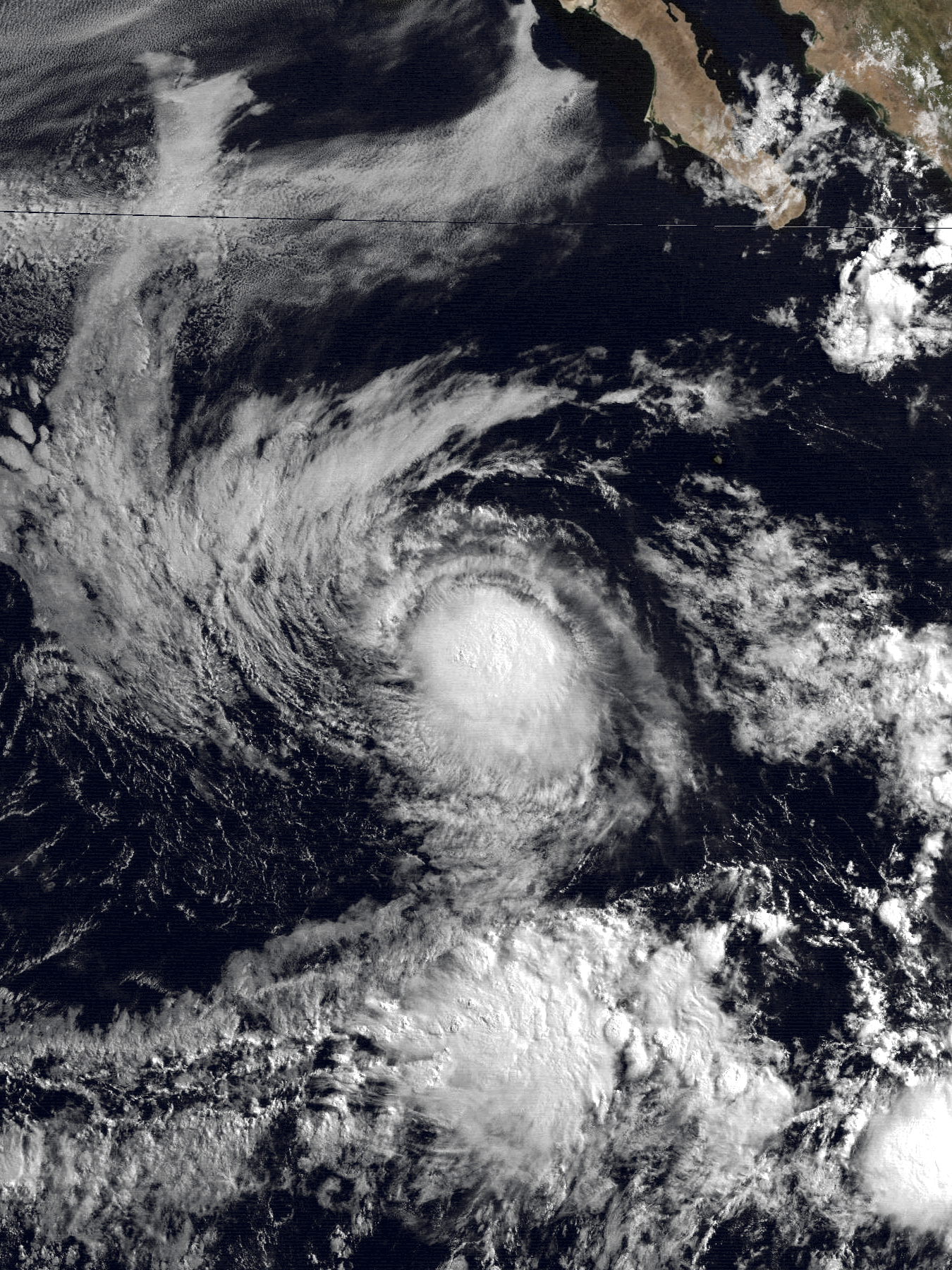
Tropical Storm Cristina near peak intensity on June 12

- 12:00 UTC (5:00 a.m. PDT) at 15.3°N 114.6°W – Tropical Storm Cristina attains its peak intensity, with maximum sustained winds of 65 mph (100 km/h) and a minimum central pressure of 994 mbar (29.35 inHg), while located about 605 mi (970 km) south-southwest of the southern tip of the Baja California peninsula.

June 14

- 00:00 UTC (5:00 p.m. PDT, June 13) at 17.0°N 120.1°W – Tropical Storm Cristina weakens into a tropical depression while located about 770 mi (1,240 km) west-southwest of the southern tip of the Baja California peninsula.

June 16

- 12:00 UTC (5:00 a.m. PDT) at 17.5°N 125.0°W – Tropical Depression Cristina dissipates while located about 1,040 mi (1,675 km) west-southwest of the southern tip of the Baja California peninsula.

June 19

- 00:00 UTC (5:00 p.m. PDT, June 18) at 13.5°N 100.0°W – Tropical Depression Four-E develops from a tropical wave while located about 230 mi (370 km) south of Acapulco.
- 18:00 UTC (11:00 a.m. PDT) at 14.2°N 101.8°W – Tropical Depression Four-E strengthens into Tropical Storm Douglas while located about 225 mi (360 km) southwest of Acapulco.

June 21

- 12:00 UTC (5:00 a.m. PDT) at 17.8°N 104.2°W – Tropical Storm Douglas attains its peak intensity, with maximum sustained winds of 65 mph (100 km/h) and a minimum central pressure of 992 mbar (29.29 inHg), while located about 85 mi (140 km) south of Manzanillo.

June 23

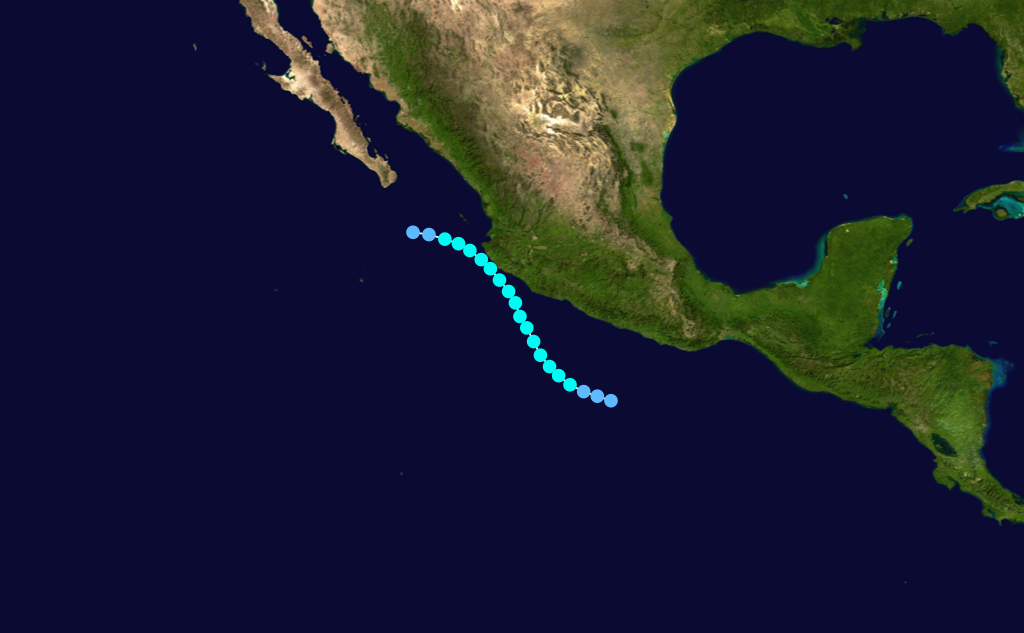
Storm track of Tropical Storm Douglas

- 12:00 UTC (5:00 a.m. PDT) at 20.8°N 108.0°W – Tropical Storm Douglas weakens into a tropical depression while located about 190 mi (305 km) southeast of the southern tip of the Baja California peninsula.
- 18:00 UTC (11:00 a.m. PDT) at 20.9°N 108.7°W – Tropical Depression Douglas is last noted as a tropical cyclone while located about 160 mi (260 km) south-southeast of the southern tip of the Baja California peninsula, dissipating shortly thereafter.

June 26

- 06:00 UTC (11:00 p.m. PDT, June 25) at 14.2°N 102.6°W – Tropical Depression Five-E develops from a tropical wave while located about 260 mi (415 km) southwest of Acapulco.
- 18:00 UTC (11:00 a.m. PDT) at 15.2°N 105.5°W – Tropical Depression Five-E strengthens into Tropical Storm Elida while located about 390 mi (630 km) west-southwest of Acapulco.

June 28

- 00:00 UTC (5:00 p.m. PDT, June 27) at 18.0°N 110.1°W – Tropical Storm Elida strengthens into a Category 1 hurricane while located about 80 mi (130 km) southeast of Socorro Island.
- 06:00 UTC (11:00 p.m. PDT, June 27) at 18.6°N 110.8°W – Hurricane Elida attains its peak intensity, with maximum sustained winds of 80 mph (130 km/h) and a minimum central pressure of 990 mbar (29.23 inHg), while located about 15 mi (30 km) southeast of Socorro Island.

June 29

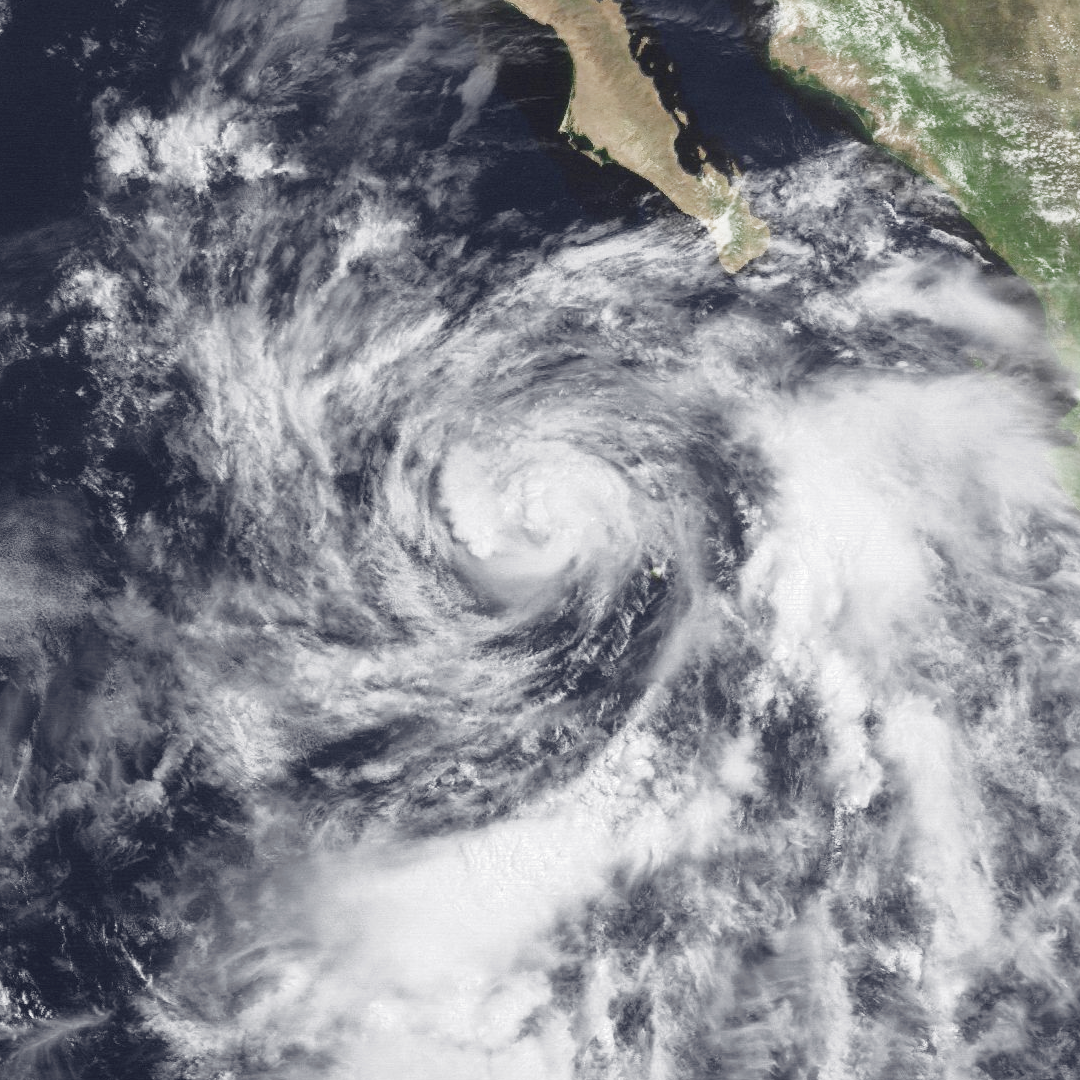
Hurricane Elida at peak intensity late on June 28

- 12:00 UTC (5:00 a.m. PDT) at 20.6°N 116.1°W – Hurricane Elida weakens into a tropical storm while located about 355 mi (575 km) west-northwest of Socorro Island.
- 18:00 UTC (11:00 a.m. PDT) at 9.9°N 101.4°W – Tropical Depression Six-E develops from an area of unsettled weather while located about 490 mi (785 km) south of Acapulco.

=== July ===
July 1

- 00:00 UTC (5:00 p.m. PDT, June 30) at 21.0°N 124.7°W – Tropical Storm Elida weakens into a tropical depression about 905 mi (1,455 km) west of Socorro Island.

July 2

- 12:00 UTC (5:00 a.m. PDT) at 20.9°N 130.4°W – Tropical Depression Elida is last noted as a tropical cyclone about 1,270 mi (2,045 km) west of Socorro Island, dissipating shortly thereafter.

July 3

- 18:00 UTC (11:00 a.m. PDT) at 18.7°N 108.5°W – Tropical Depression Six-E attains its peak intensity, with maximum sustained winds of 35 mph (55 km/h) and a minimum central pressure of 1007 mbar (29.74 inHg), (Note: Tropical Depression Six-E previously attained maximum sustained winds of 35 mph (55 km/h) at 06:00 UTC on June 30 (11:00 p.m. PDT on June 29), maintaining these winds through 06:00 UTC on July 3 (11:00 p.m. PDT on July 2). Since the central pressure of Six-E was not recorded during this period, it is possible that the system's true minimum pressure was somewhat less than 1007 mbar (29.74 inHg).) while located about 275 mi (445 km) west of Manzanillo, dissipating shortly thereafter.

July 6

- 00:00 UTC (5:00 p.m. PDT, July 5) at 13.3°N 102.1°W – Tropical Depression Seven-E develops from a tropical wave while located about 290 mi (465 km) south-southwest of Acapulco.

July 7

- 00:00 UTC (5:00 p.m. PDT, July 6) at 15.3°N 104.8°W – Tropical Depression Seven-E strengthens into Tropical Storm Fausto while located about 260 mi (415 km) south of Manzanillo.

July 8

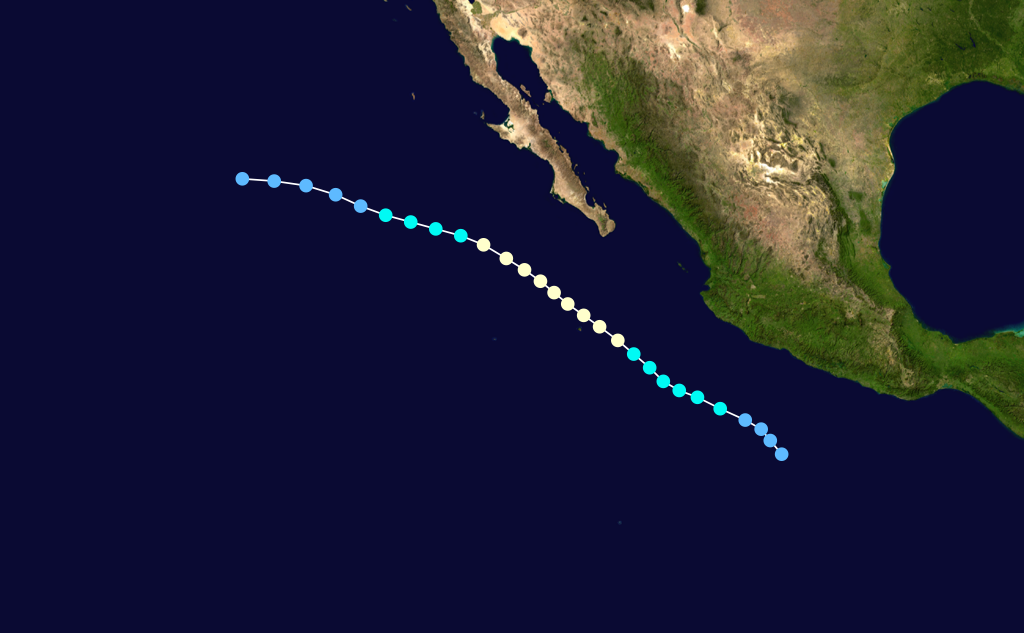
Storm track of Hurricane Fausto

- 12:00 UTC (5:00 a.m. PDT) at 18.3°N 109.3°W – Tropical Storm Fausto strengthens into a Category 1 hurricane while located about 315 mi (510 km) south of the southern tip of the Baja California peninsula.

July 9

- 00:00 UTC (5:00 p.m. PDT, July 8) at 19.4°N 110.8°W – Hurricane Fausto attains its peak intensity, with maximum sustained winds of 85 mph (140 km/h) and a minimum central pressure of 979 mbar (28.91 inHg), while located about 245 mi (400 km) south-southwest of the southern tip of the Baja California peninsula.

July 10

- 00:00 UTC (5:00 p.m. PDT, July 9) at 10.2°N 94.5°W – Tropical Depression Eight-E develops from a tropical wave while located about 405 mi (650 km) south-southeast of Puerto Ángel, Oaxaca.
- 06:00 UTC (11:00 p.m. PDT, July 9) at 21.9°N 114.2°W – After weakening slightly, Hurricane Fausto reattains its peak intensity while located about 275 mi (445 km) west of the southern tip of the Baja California peninsula.
- 18:00 UTC (11:00 a.m. PDT) at 22.9°N 116.2°W – Hurricane Fausto weakens into a tropical storm while located about 395 mi (640 km) west of the southern tip of the Baja California peninsula.

July 11

- 18:00 UTC (11:00 a.m. PDT) at 24.2°N 120.6°W – Tropical Storm Fausto weakens into a tropical depression while located about 425 mi (685 km) southwest of Punta Eugenia.
- 18:00 UTC (11:00 a.m. PDT) at 13.8°N 102.2°W – Tropical Depression Eight-E strengthens into Tropical Storm Genevieve while located about 405 mi (650 km) west-southwest of Puerto Ángel.

July 12

- 18:00 UTC (11:00 a.m. PDT) at 25.4°N 125.8°W – Tropical Depression Fausto is last noted as a tropical cyclone while located about 685 mi (1,100 km) west-southwest of Punta Eugenia, dissipating shortly thereafter.

July 13

- 00:00 UTC (5:00 p.m. PDT, July 12) at 16.9°N 108.3°W – Tropical Storm Genevieve strengthens into a Category 1 hurricane while located about 220 mi (350 km) southeast of Socorro Island.

July 15

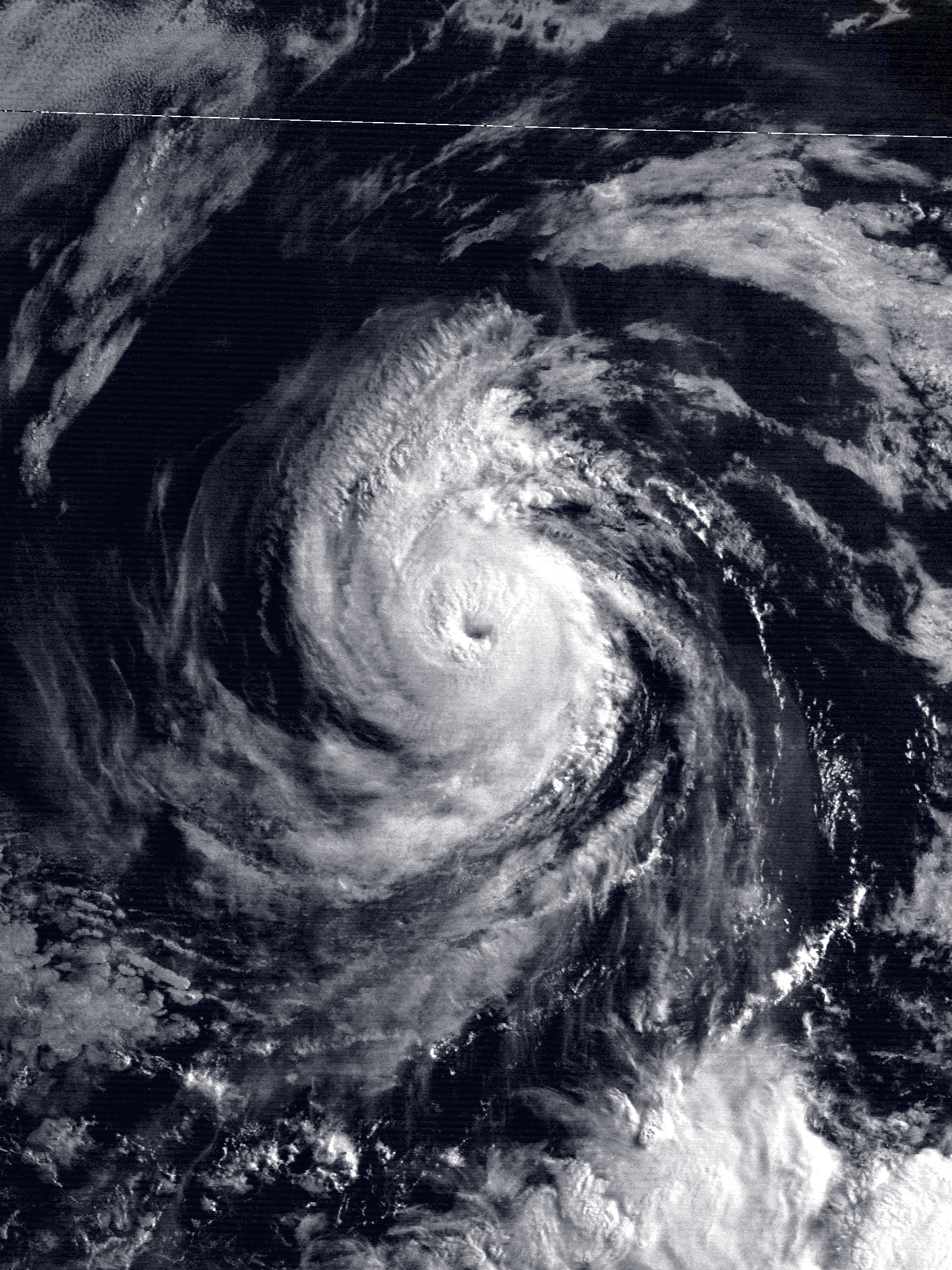
Hurricane Genevieve near peak intensity on July 15

- 00:00 UTC (5:00 p.m. PDT, July 14) at 19.7°N 115.5°W – Hurricane Genevieve strengthens to Category 2 intensity while located about 300 mi (480 km) west of Socorro Island.
- 12:00 UTC (5:00 a.m. PDT) at 20.2°N 117.0°W – Hurricane Genevieve attains its peak intensity, with maximum sustained winds of 105 mph (165 km/h) and a minimum central pressure of 970 mbar (28.64 inHg), while located about 405 mi (650 km) west-northwest of Socorro Island.

July 16

- 06:00 UTC (11:00 p.m. PDT, July 15) at 21.5°N 119.2°W – Hurricane Genevieve weakens to Category 1 intensity while located about 565 mi (905 km) west-northwest of Socorro Island.

July 17

- 00:00 UTC (5:00 p.m. PDT, July 16) at 23.1°N 121.3°W – Hurricane Genevieve weakens into a tropical storm while located about 505 mi (815 km) southwest of Punta Eugenia.

July 18

- 00:00 UTC (5:00 p.m. PDT, July 17) at 25.5°N 123.1°W – Tropical Storm Genevieve weakens into a tropical depression while located about 520 mi (835 km) west-southwest of Punta Eugenia.
- 12:00 UTC (5:00 a.m. PDT) at 26.3°N 123.7°W – Tropical Depression Genevieve is last noted as a tropical cyclone while located about 540 mi (870 km) west of Punta Eugenia, dissipating shortly thereafter.

July 19

- 12:00 UTC (5:00 a.m. PDT) at 12.0°N 106.5°W – Tropical Depression Nine-E develops from a tropical wave while located about 560 mi (900 km) southwest of Acapulco.

July 20

- 12:00 UTC (5:00 a.m. PDT) at 10.0°N 96.1°W – Tropical Depression Ten-E develops from a tropical wave while located about 535 mi (860 km) south-southeast of Acapulco.

July 21

- 00:00 UTC (5:00 p.m. PDT, July 20) at 12.9°N 111.3°W – Tropical Depression Nine-E strengthens into Tropical Storm Hernan while located about 695 mi (1,120 km) south of the southern tip of the Baja California peninsula.
- 12:00 UTC (5:00 a.m. PDT) at 11.8°N 100.3°W – Tropical Depression Ten-E strengthens into Tropical Storm Iselle while located about 350 mi (565 km) south of Acapulco.
- 18:00 UTC (11:00 a.m. PDT) at 14.3°N 113.2°W – – Tropical Storm Hernan strengthens into a Category 1 hurricane while located about 625 mi (1,010 km) south-southwest of the southern tip of the Baja California peninsula.

July 22

- 06:00 UTC (11:00 p.m. PDT, July 21) at 15.3°N 114.2°W – Hurricane Hernan strengthens to Category 2 intensity while located about 595 mi (955 km) south-southwest of the southern tip of the Baja California peninsula.
- 12:00 UTC (5:00 a.m. PDT) at 15.7°N 114.8°W – Hurricane Hernan strengthens to Category 3 intensity while located about 585 mi (945 km) southwest of the southern tip of the Baja California peninsula, making it the first major hurricane of the season.
- 18:00 UTC (11:00 a.m. PDT) at 16.2°N 115.3°W – Hurricane Hernan strengthens to Category 4 intensity while located about 575 mi (925 km) southwest of the southern tip of the Baja California peninsula.
- 18:00 UTC (11:00 a.m. PDT) at 14.4°N 103.6°W – Tropical Storm Iselle strengthens into a Category 1 hurricane while located about 300 mi (480 km) southwest of Acapulco.

July 23

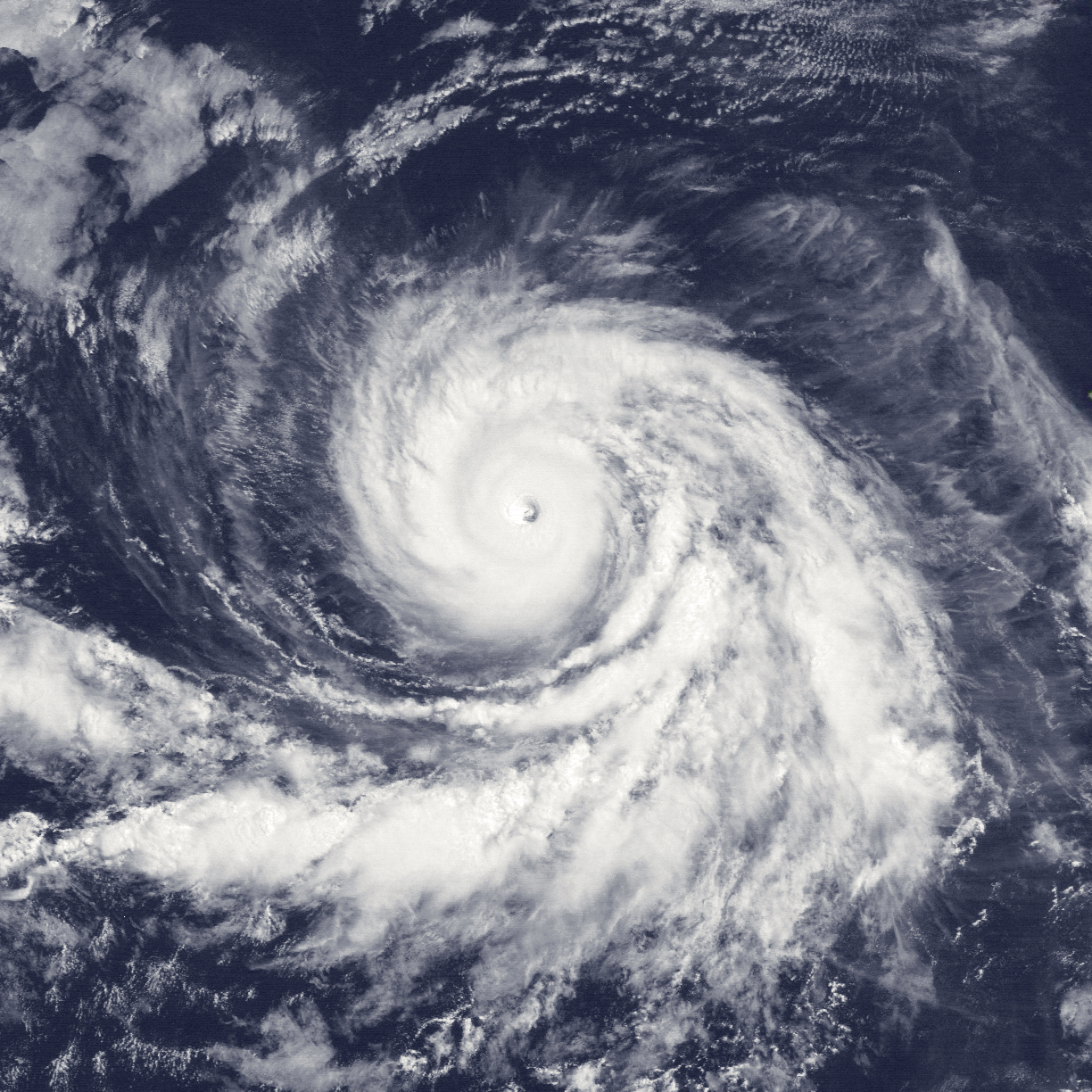
Hurricane Hernan at peak intensity on July 23

- 18:00 UTC (11:00 a.m. PDT) at 17.5°N 117.9°W – Hurricane Hernan attains its peak intensity, with maximum sustained winds of 155 mph (250 km/h) and a minimum central pressure of 928 mbar (27.40 inHg), while located about 635 mi (1,020 km) southwest of the southern tip of the Baja California peninsula.
- 18:00 UTC (11:00 a.m. PDT) at 16.0°N 106.2°W – Hurricane Iselle strengthens to Category 2 intensity while located about 370 mi (595 km) east-southeast of Socorro Island.

July 24

- 00:00 UTC (5:00 p.m. PDT, July 23) at 12.5°N 129.0°W – Tropical Depression Eleven-E develops from an area of unsettled weather while located about 1,440 mi (2,315 km) west-southwest of the southern tip of the Baja California peninsula.
- 12:00 UTC (5:00 a.m. PDT) at 17.0°N 108.3°W – Hurricane Iselle strengthens to Category 3 intensity while located about 215 mi (345 km) southeast of Socorro Island, making it the second major hurricane of the season.

July 25

- 00:00 UTC (5:00 p.m. PDT, July 24) at 14.2°N 129.8°W – Tropical Depression Eleven-E attains its peak intensity, with maximum sustained winds of 30 mph (45 km/h) and a minimum central pressure of 1009 mbar (29.80 inHg), while located about 1,425 mi (2,295 km) west-southwest of the southern tip of the Baja California peninsula.
- 06:00 UTC (11:00 p.m. PDT, July 24) at 18.3°N 121.3°W – Hurricane Hernan weakens to Category 3 intensity while located about 800 mi (1,285 km) west-southwest of the southern tip of the Baja California peninsula.
- 12:00 UTC (5:00 a.m. PDT) at 19.2°N 111.7°W – Hurricane Iselle attains its peak intensity, with maximum sustained winds of 120 mph (195 km/h) and a minimum central pressure of 958 mbar (28.29 inHg), while located about 60 mi (95 km) west-northwest of Socorro Island.

July 26

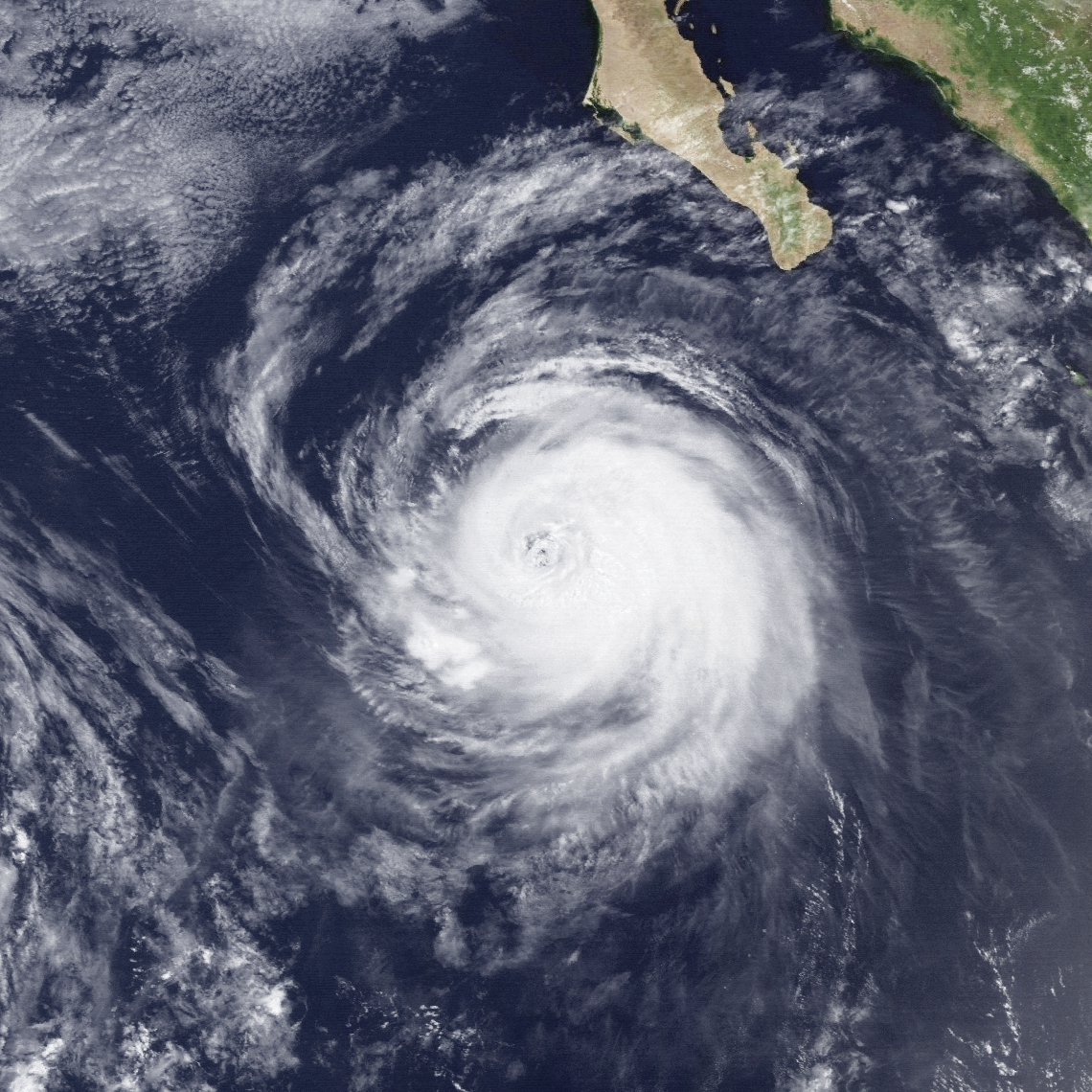
Hurricane Iselle at peak intensity late on July 25

- 06:00 UTC (11:00 p.m. PDT, July 25) at 14.5°N 131.5°W – Tropical Depression Eleven-E is last noted as a tropical cyclone while located about 1,520 mi (2,445 km) west-southwest of the southern tip of the Baja California peninsula, dissipating shortly thereafter.
- 18:00 UTC (11:00 a.m. PDT) at 19.4°N 125.7°W – Hurricane Hernan weakens to Category 2 intensity while located about 1,040 mi (1,675 km) west-southwest of the southern tip of the Baja California peninsula.
- 18:00 UTC (11:00 a.m. PDT) at 22.0°N 116.5°W – Hurricane Iselle weakens to Category 2 intensity while located about 420 mi (675 km) west-northwest of Socorro Island.

July 27

- 00:00 UTC (5:00 p.m. PDT, July 26) at 19.6°N 126.5°W – Hurricane Hernan weakens to Category 1 intensity while located about 1,085 mi (1,750 km) west of the southern tip of the Baja California peninsula.
- 18:00 UTC (11:00 a.m. PDT) at 23.8°N 119.9°W – Hurricane Iselle weakens to Category 1 intensity while located about 410 mi (655 km) southwest of Punta Eugenia.

July 28

- 00:00 UTC (5:00 p.m. PDT, July 27) at 20.0°N 129.9°W – Hurricane Hernan weakens into a tropical storm while located about 1,295 mi (2,085 km) west of the southern tip of the Baja California peninsula.
- 18:00 UTC (11:00 a.m. PDT) at 25.5°N 121.6°W – Hurricane Iselle weakens into a tropical storm while located about 430 mi (695 km) west-southwest of Punta Eugenia.

July 30

- 00:00 UTC (5:00 p.m. PDT, July 29) at 22.8°N 136.7°W – Tropical Storm Hernan weakens into a tropical depression while located about 1,390 mi (2,240 km) west-southwest of Punta Eugenia.
- 00:00 UTC (5:00 p.m. PDT, July 29) at 25.6°N 121.8°W – Tropical Storm Iselle weakens into a tropical depression while located about 445 mi (715 km) west-southwest of Punta Eugenia.
- 12:00 UTC (5:00 a.m. PDT) at 25.4°N 122.1°W – Tropical Depression Iselle is last noted as a tropical cyclone while located about 465 mi (750 km) west-southwest of Punta Eugenia, dissipating shortly thereafter.

July 31

- 00:00 UTC (5:00 p.m. PDT, July 30) at 26.2°N 138.5°W – Tropical Depression Hernan is last noted as a tropical cyclone while located about 1,445 mi (2,325 km) west of Punta Eugenia, dissipating shortly thereafter.

=== August ===
August 7

- 18:00 UTC (8:00 a.m. HST) at 10.5°N 150.0°W – Tropical Depression One-C develops from an area of unsettled weather while located about 695 mi (1,120 km) southeast of South Point, Hawaii.

August 8

- 00:00 UTC (2:00 p.m. HST, August 7) at 10.6°N 151.5°W – Tropical Depression One-C strengthens into Tropical Storm Aka while located about 640 mi (1,030 km) south-southeast of South Point.

August 9

- 12:00 UTC (5:00 a.m. PDT) at 22.5°N 107.0°W – Having made landfall on the Atlantic side of Mexico the previous day, Tropical Depression Diana emerges off the Pacific coast while located about 175 mi (280 km) northwest of Puerto Vallarta, Jalisco, dissipating shortly thereafter. (Note: Operationally, the National Hurricane Center (NHC) declared Diana to have dissipated over the mountainous terrain of central Mexico, hence why it was not redesignated upon crossing over.)

August 10

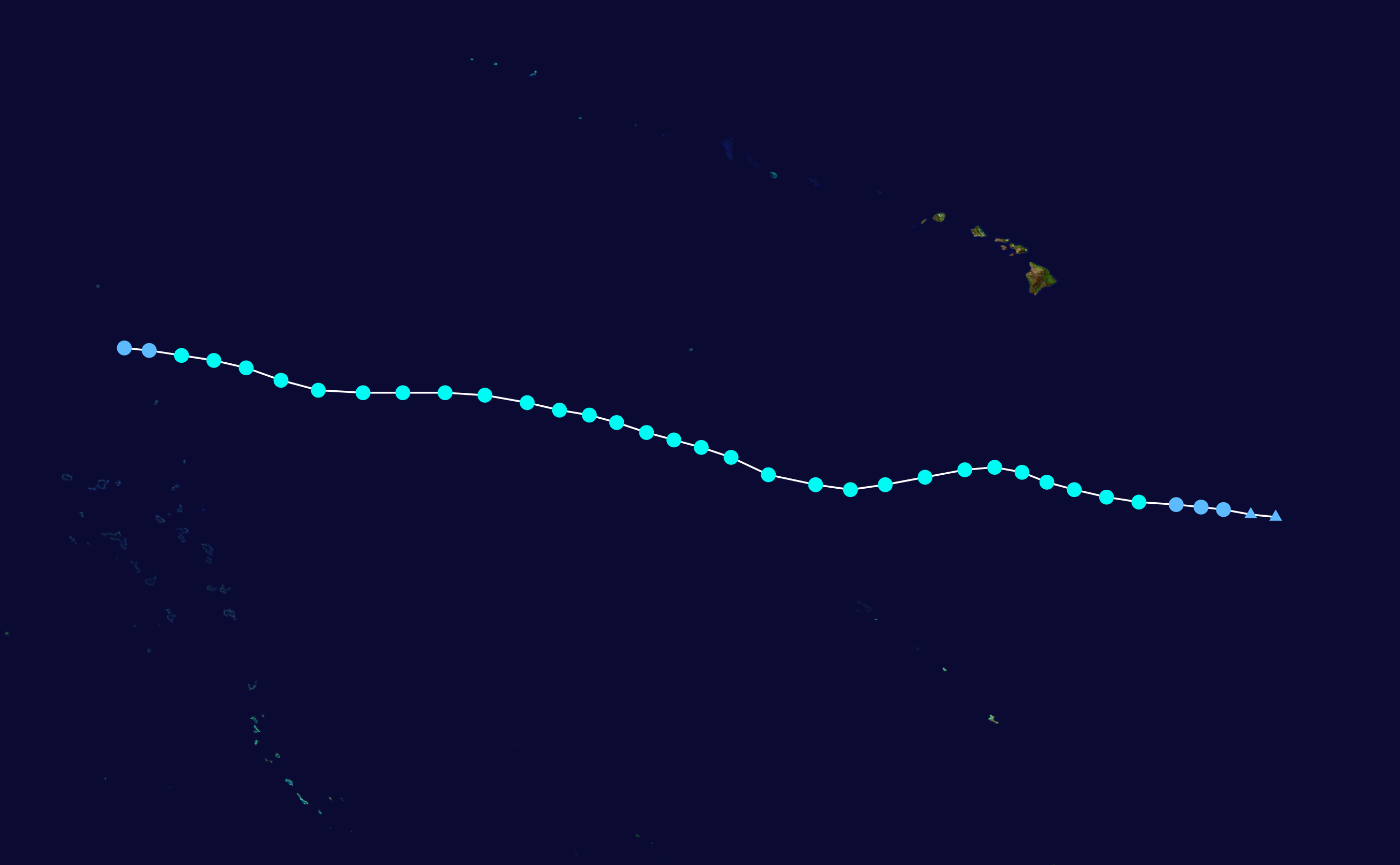
Storm track of Tropical Storm Aka, the only named storm in the Central Pacific in 1990

- 12:00 UTC (2:00 a.m. HST) at 11.3°N 164.5°W – Tropical Storm Aka attains its peak intensity, with maximum sustained winds of 65 mph (100 km/h) and an unknown central pressure, while located about 505 mi (815 km) southeast of Johnston Island.
- 18:00 UTC (8:00 a.m. HST) at 11.0°N 142.5°W – Tropical Depression Two-C develops from an area of unsettled weather while located about 1,030 mi (1,660 km) southeast of Hilo, Hawaii. It is already at its peak intensity, with maximum sustained winds of 35 mph (55 km/h) and an unknown central pressure.

August 13

- 00:00 UTC (2:00 p.m. HST, August 12) at 10.5°N 151.0°W – Tropical Depression Two-C is last noted as a tropical cyclone while located about 690 mi (1,110 km) south-southeast of Hilo, dissipating shortly thereafter.
- 06:00 UTC (8:00 p.m. HST, August 12) at 15.0°N 179.4°W – Tropical Storm Aka crosses the International Date Line into the Western Pacific basin while located about 665 mi (1,075 km) west of Johnston Island, becoming part of the annual typhoon season.

August 16

- 12:00 UTC (5:00 a.m. PDT) at 10.6°N 111.5°W – Tropical Depression Twelve-E develops from an area of unsettled weather while located about 810 mi (1,305 km) south-southwest of Puerto Vallarta.

August 17

- 00:00 UTC (5:00 p.m. PDT, August 16) at 11.1°N 99.0°W – Tropical Depression Thirteen-E develops from a tropical wave while located about 405 mi (650 km) south of Acapulco.

August 18

- 00:00 UTC (5:00 p.m. PDT, August 17) at 11.1°N 118.6°W – Tropical Depression Twelve-E attains its peak intensity, with maximum sustained winds of 35 mph (55 km/h) and a minimum central pressure of 1009 mbar (29.80 inHg), while located about 1,105 mi (1,780 km) southwest of Puerto Vallarta.
- 06:00 UTC (11:00 p.m. PDT, August 17) at 12.7°N 106.6°W – Tropical Depression Thirteen-E strengthens into Tropical Storm Julio while located about 535 mi (860 km) south of Cabo Corrientes, Jalisco.

August 19

- 12:00 UTC (5:00 a.m. PDT) at 14.8°N 112.6°W – Tropical Storm Julio strengthens into a Category 1 hurricane while located about 580 mi (935 km) south-southwest of the southern tip of the Baja California peninsula.
- 12:00 UTC (5:00 a.m. PDT) at 13.2°N 125.6°W – Tropical Depression Twelve-E is last noted as a tropical cyclone while located about 1,440 mi (2,315 km) west-southwest of Puerto Vallarta, dissipating shortly thereafter.

August 20

- 12:00 UTC (5:00 a.m. PDT) at 16.1°N 116.7°W – Hurricane Julio strengthens to Category 2 intensity while located about 640 mi (1,030 km) southwest of the southern tip of the Baja California peninsula.

August 21

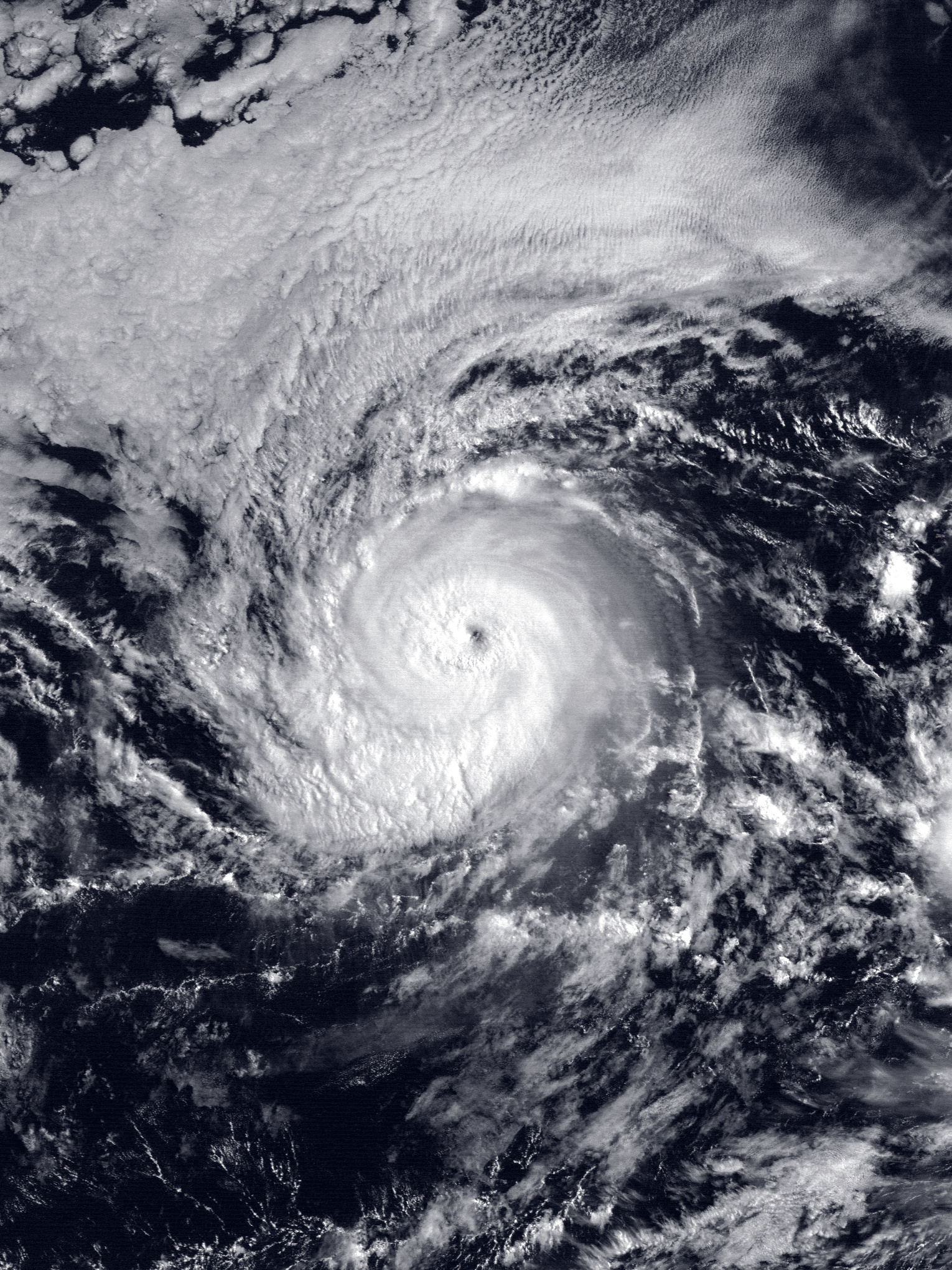
Hurricane Julio at peak intensity on August 21

- 06:00 UTC (11:00 p.m. PDT, August 20) at 16.7°N 119.5°W – Hurricane Julio strengthens to Category 3 intensity while located about 755 mi (1,215 km) southwest of the southern tip of the Baja California peninsula, making it the third major hurricane of the season.
- 12:00 UTC (5:00 a.m. PDT) at 16.9°N 120.6°W – Hurricane Julio attains its peak intensity, with maximum sustained winds of 115 mph (185 km/h) and a minimum central pressure of 960 mbar (28.35 inHg), while located about 805 mi (1,295 km) west-southwest of the southern tip of the Baja California peninsula.
- 18:00 UTC (11:00 a.m. PDT) at 14.0°N 111.6°W – Tropical Depression Fourteen-E develops from the remnants of Atlantic Tropical Storm Fran while located about 335 mi (535 km) south of Socorro Island.

August 22

- 06:00 UTC (11:00 p.m. PDT, August 21) at 16.9°N 124.2°W – Hurricane Julio weakens to Category 2 intensity while located about 1,015 mi (1,630 km) west-southwest of the southern tip of the Baja California peninsula.
- 06:00 UTC (11:00 p.m. PDT, August 21) at 14.6°N 113.6°W – Tropical Depression Fourteen-E strengthens into Tropical Storm Kenna while located about 340 mi (545 km) south-southwest of Socorro Island.
- 12:00 UTC (5:00 a.m. PDT) at 16.9°N 125.5°W – Hurricane Julio weakens to Category 1 intensity while located about 1,085 mi (1,750 km) west-southwest of the southern tip of the Baja California peninsula.

August 23

- 00:00 UTC (5:00 p.m. PDT, August 22) at 16.8°N 128.4°W – Hurricane Julio weakens into a tropical storm while located about 1,265 mi (2,035 km) west-southwest of the southern tip of the Baja California peninsula.
- 18:00 UTC (11:00 a.m. PDT) at 14.0°N 96.5°E – Tropical Depression Fifteen-E develops from a tropical wave while located about 300 mi (480 km).

August 24

- 06:00 UTC (11:00 p.m. PDT, August 23) at 17.8°N 135.3°W – Tropical Storm Julio weakens into a tropical depression while located about 1,675 mi (2,695 km) west of the southern tip of the Baja California peninsula.
- 18:00 UTC (11:00 a.m. PDT) at 17.1°N 137.8°W – Tropical Depression Julio is last noted as a tropical cyclone while located about 1,845 mi (2,970 km) west of the southern tip of the Baja California peninsula, dissipating shortly thereafter.

August 25

- 00:00 UTC (5:00 p.m. PDT, August 24) at 15.1°N 124.3°W – Tropical Storm Kenna strengthens into a Category 1 hurricane while located about 915 mi (1,470 km) west-southwest of Socorro Island.
- 18:00 UTC (11:00 a.m. PDT) at 17.7°N 106.2°W – Tropical Depression Fifteen-E strengthens into Tropical Storm Lowell while located about 215 mi (345 km) south-southwest of Puerto Vallarta.

August 26

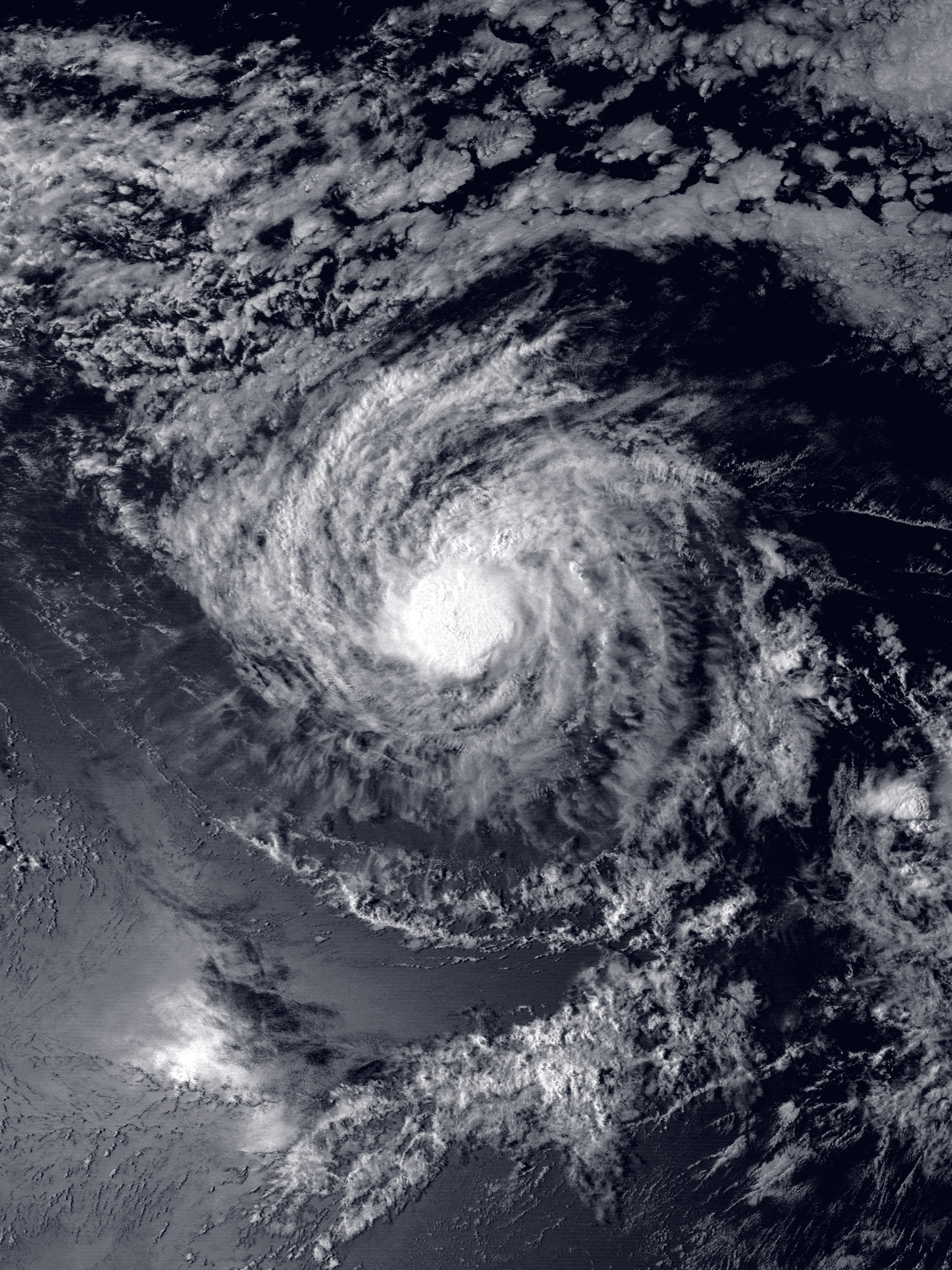
Hurricane Kenna at peak intensity early on August 26

- 00:00 UTC (5:00 p.m. PDT, August 25) at 15.8°N 129.3°W – Hurricane Kenna attains its peak intensity, with maximum sustained winds of 85 mph (140 km/h) and a minimum central pressure of 980 mbar (28.94 inHg), while located about 1,225 mi (1,970 km) west of Socorro Island.

August 27

- 06:00 UTC (11:00 p.m. PDT, August 26) at 19.5°N 112.5°W – Tropical Storm Lowell strengthens into a Category 1 hurricane while located about 280 mi (455 km) southwest of the southern tip of the Baja California peninsula.

August 28

- 00:00 UTC (5:00 p.m. PDT, August 27) at 20.3°N 134.3°W – Hurricane Kenna weakens into a tropical storm while located about 1,520 mi (2,445 km) west of Socorro Island.
- 00:00 UTC (5:00 p.m. PDT, August 27) at 19.1°N 116.2°W – Hurricane Lowell attains its peak intensity, with maximum sustained winds of 75 mph (120 km/h) and a minimum central pressure of 986 mbar (29.12 inHg), while located about 480 mi (770 km) southwest of the southern tip of the Baja California peninsula.
- 18:00 UTC (11:00 a.m. PDT) at 18.2°N 119.8°W – Hurricane Lowell weakens into a tropical storm while located about 715 mi (1,150 km) west-southwest of the southern tip of the Baja California peninsula.

August 29

- 06:00 UTC (11:00 p.m. PDT, August 28) at 21.3°N 134.3°W – Tropical Storm Kenna weakens into a tropical depression while located about 1,520 mi (2,445 km) west of Socorro Island.

August 30

- 12:00 UTC (5:00 a.m. PDT) at 19.5°N 137.8°W – Tropical Depression Kenna is last noted as a tropical cyclone while located about 1,750 mi (2,815 km) west of Socorro Island, dissipating shortly thereafter.

August 31

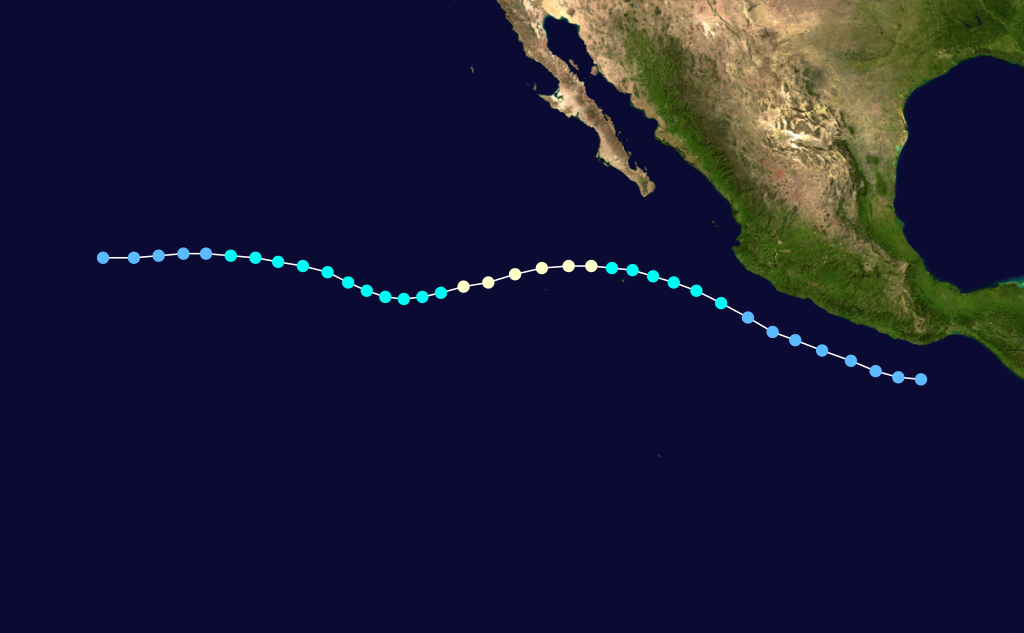
Storm track of Hurricane Lowell

- 12:00 UTC (5:00 a.m. PDT) at 20.1°N 131.2°W – Tropical Storm Lowell weakens into a tropical depression while located about 1,375 mi (2,215 km) west of the southern tip of the Baja California peninsula.

=== September ===
September 1

- 12:00 UTC (5:00 a.m. PDT) at 19.9°N 136.2°W – Tropical Depression Lowell is last noted as a tropical cyclone while located about 1,695 mi (2,730 km) west of the southern tip of the Baja California peninsula, dissipating shortly thereafter.

September 7

- 12:00 UTC (5:00 a.m. PDT) at 12.0°N 122.0°W – Tropical Depression Sixteen-E develops from a tropical wave while located about 655 mi (1,055 km) southwest of Clarion Island.

September 8

- 12:00 UTC (5:00 a.m. PDT) at 13.2°N 126.3°W – Tropical Depression Sixteen-E strengthens into Tropical Storm Marie while located about 845 mi (1,360 km) west-southwest of Clarion Island.

September 9

- 06:00 UTC (11:00 p.m. PDT, September 8) at 14.3°N 128.6°W – Tropical Storm Marie strengthens into a Category 1 hurricane while located about 960 mi (1,545 km) west-southwest of Clarion Island.
- 18:00 UTC (11:00 a.m. PDT) at 12.8°N 102.3°W – Tropical Depression Eighteen-E (Note: Operationally, the NHC did not initiate advisories on Tropical Depression Eighteen-E until 02:30 UTC on September 12 (7:30 p.m. PDT on September 11). Advisories on Tropical Depression Seventeen-E—future Hurricane Norbert—had been initiated roughly 36 hours prior, resulting in that system receiving an earlier number despite forming shortly after Eighteen-E.) develops from an area of unsettled weather while located about 320 mi (520 km) south-southwest of Acapulco.

September 10

- 00:00 UTC (5:00 p.m. PDT, September 9) at 14.9°N 129.9°W – Hurricane Marie strengthens to Category 2 intensity while located about 1,030 mi (1,660 km) west-southwest of Clarion Island.
- 00:00 UTC (5:00 p.m. PDT, September 9) at 12.2°N 111.6°W – Tropical Depression Seventeen-E develops from a tropical wave while located about 740 mi (1,195 km) south of the southern tip of the Baja California peninsula.
- 12:00 UTC (5:00 a.m. PDT) at 15.0°N 131.0°W – Hurricane Marie strengthens to Category 3 intensity while located about 1,100 mi (1,770 km) west of Clarion Island, making it the fourth major hurricane of the season.
- 18:00 UTC (11:00 a.m. PDT) at 13.1°N 111.9°W – Tropical Depression Seventeen-E strengthens into Tropical Storm Norbert while located about 685 mi (1,100 km) south of the southern tip of the Baja California peninsula.

September 11

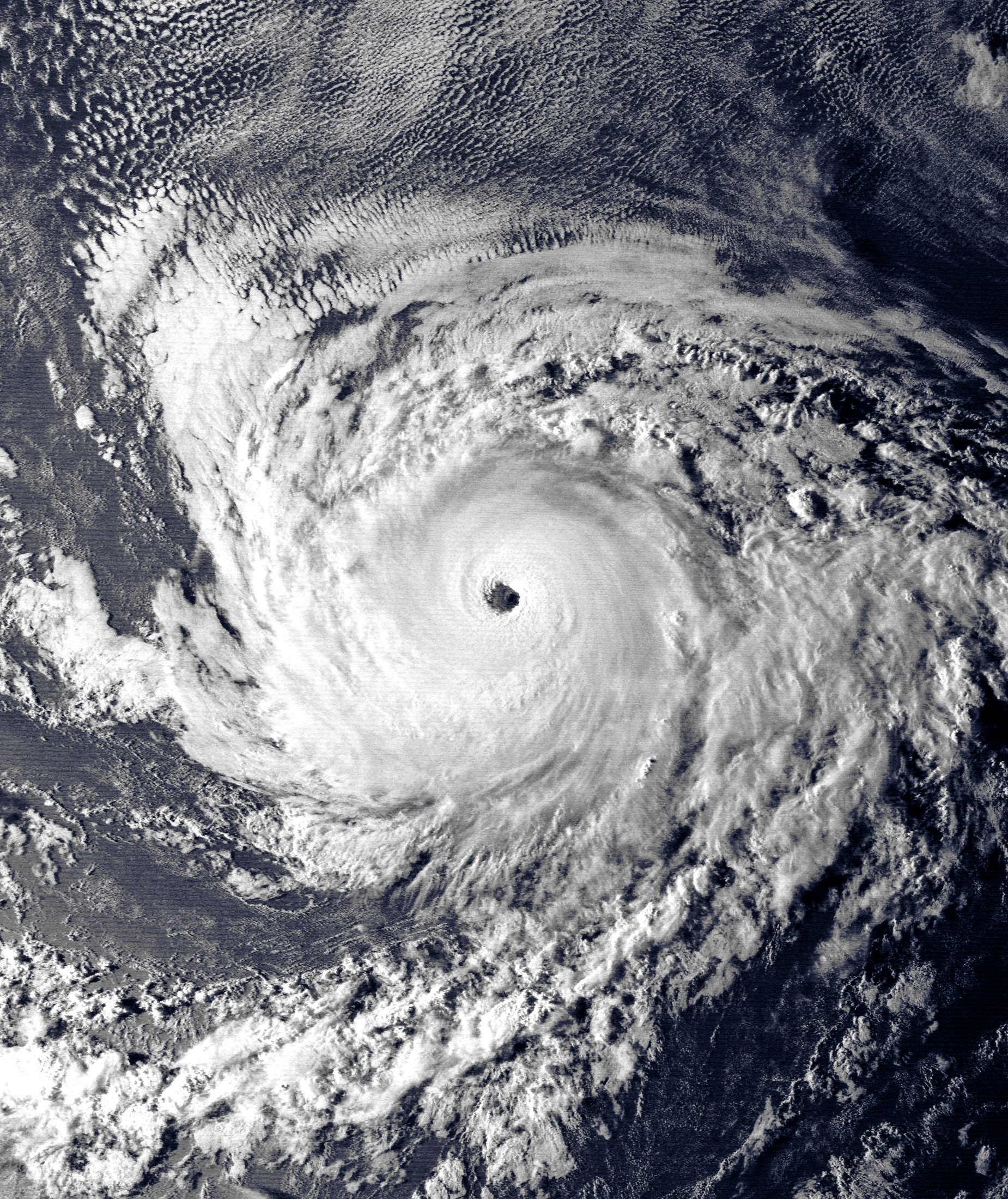
Hurricane Marie near peak intensity early on September 11

- 00:00 UTC (5:00 p.m. PDT, September 10) at 14.8°N 132.1°W – Hurricane Marie strengthens to Category 4 intensity while located about 1,175 mi (1,890 km) west of Clarion Island.
- 06:00 UTC (11:00 p.m. PDT, September 10) at 14.7°N 132.8°W – Hurricane Marie attains its peak intensity, with maximum sustained winds of 140 mph (220 km/h) and a minimum central pressure of 944 mbar (27.88 inHg), while located about 1,220 mi (1,965 km) west of Clarion Island.

September 12

- 00:00 UTC (5:00 p.m. PDT, September 11) at 15.3°N 134.9°W – Hurricane Marie weakens to Category 3 intensity while located about 1,345 mi (2,165 km) west of Clarion Island.
- 12:00 UTC (5:00 a.m. PDT) at 16.0°N 136.0°W – Hurricane Marie weakens to Category 2 intensity while located about 1,410 mi (2,270 km) west of Clarion Island.
- 12:00 UTC (5:00 a.m. PDT) at 19.1°N 114.7°W – Tropical Depression Eighteen-E attains its peak intensity, with maximum sustained winds of 35 mph (55 km/h) and a minimum central pressure of 1000 mbar (29.53 inHg), while located about 405 mi (650 km) southwest of the southern tip of the Baja California peninsula.
- 18:00 UTC (11:00 a.m. PDT) at 18.6°N 115.1°W – Tropical Depression Eighteen-E is last noted as a tropical cyclone while located about 445 mi (715 km) southwest of the southern tip of the Baja California peninsula, dissipating shortly thereafter when Tropical Storm Norbert absorbs it.

September 13

- 18:00 UTC (11:00 a.m. PDT) at 17.4°N 138.7°W – Hurricane Marie restrengthens to Category 3 intensity while located about 1,575 mi (2,535 km) west of Clarion Island.

September 14

- 00:00 UTC (5:00 p.m. PDT, September 13) at 20.7°N 119.3°W – Tropical Storm Norbert strengthens into a Category 1 hurricane while located about 615 mi (990 km) west-southwest of the southern tip of the Baja California peninsula.
- 12:00 UTC (2:00 a.m. HST) at 17.5°N 140.1°W – Hurricane Marie crosses 140°W into the Central Pacific basin while located about 990 mi (1,595 km) east of Hilo.

September 15

- 06:00 UTC (11:00 p.m. PDT, September 14) at 21.1°N 124.4°W – Hurricane Norbert attains its peak intensity, with maximum sustained winds of 80 mph (130 km/h) and a minimum central pressure of 983 mbar (29.03 inHg), while located about 930 mi (1,500 km) west of the southern tip of the Baja California peninsula.
- 18:00 UTC (11:00 a.m. PDT) at 20.9°N 126.2°W – Hurricane Norbert weakens into a tropical storm while located about 1,045 mi (1,685 km) west of the southern tip of the Baja California peninsula.

September 16

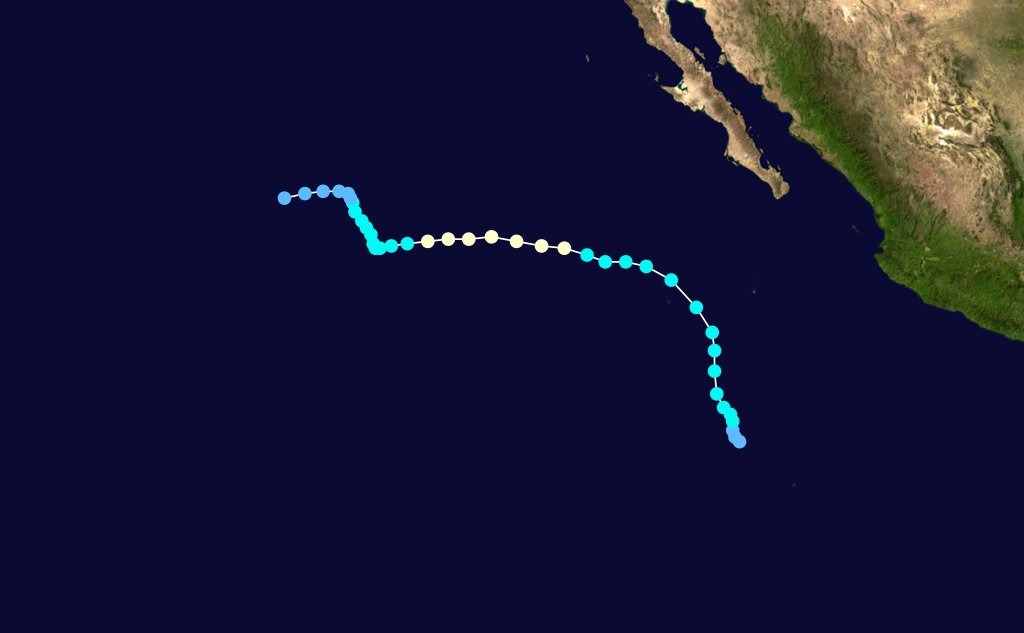

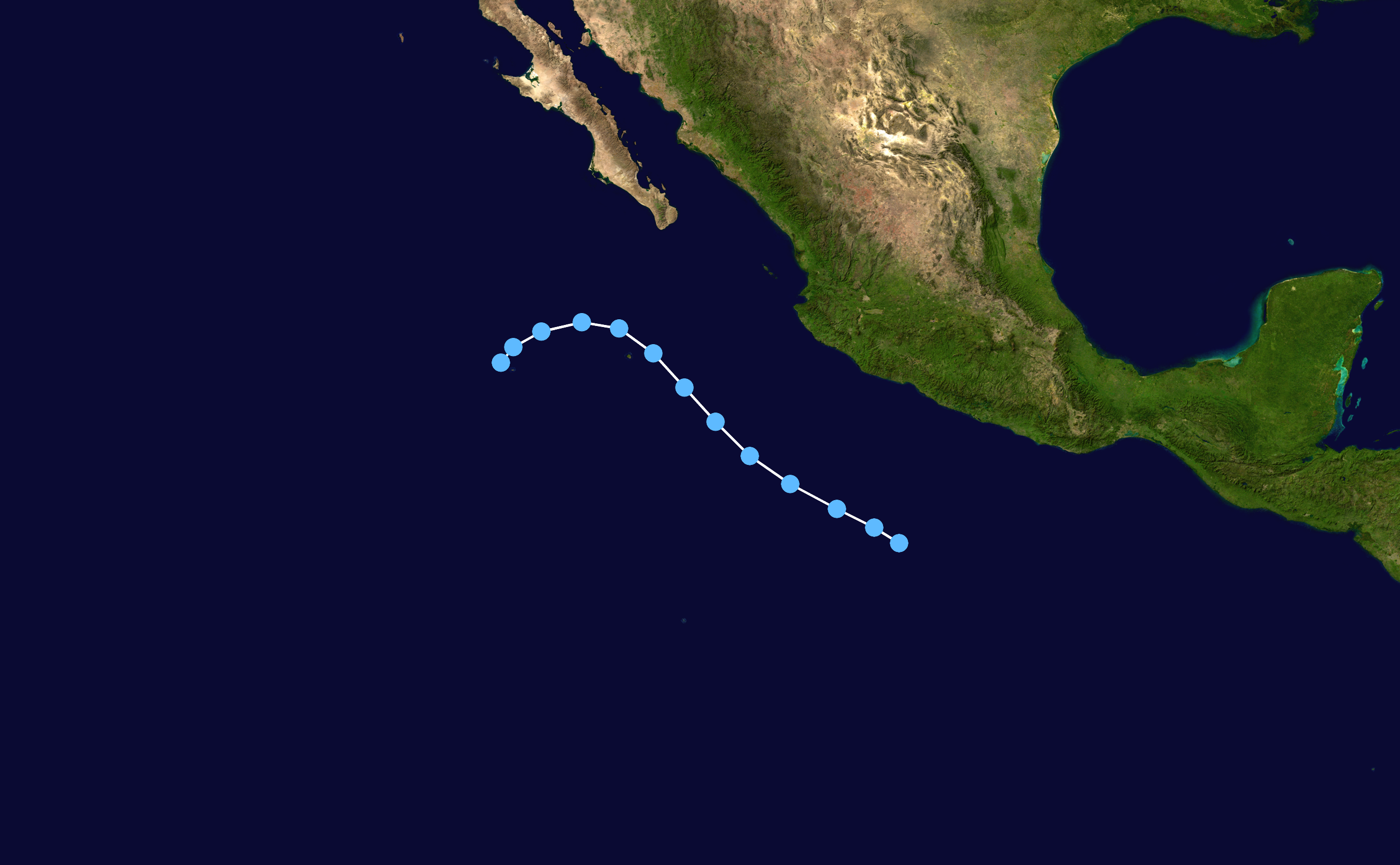
Storm tracks of Hurricane Norbert (top) and Tropical Depression Eighteen-E (bottom), which interacted with each other during the second week of September

- 18:00 UTC (8:00 a.m. HST) at 17.2°N 148.5°W – Hurricane Marie rapidly weakens to Category 1 intensity while located about 465 mi (750 km) east-southeast of Hilo.

September 17

- 06:00 UTC (8:00 p.m. HST, September 16) at 17.9°N 150.3°W – Hurricane Marie weakens into a tropical storm while located about 340 mi (545 km) east-southeast of Hilo.

September 18

- 06:00 UTC (11:00 p.m. PDT, September 17) at 22.9°N 128.7°W – Tropical Storm Norbert weakens into a tropical depression while located about 1,190 mi (1,915 km) west of the southern tip of the Baja California peninsula.

September 19

- 00:00 UTC (2:00 p.m. HST, September 18) at 16.2°N 154.5°W – Tropical Storm Marie weakens into a tropical depression while located about 245 mi (400 km) south of Hilo.
- 18:00 UTC (11:00 a.m. PDT) at 22.6°N 132.7°W – Tropical Depression Norbert dissipates while located about 1,445 mi (2,325 km) west of the southern tip of the Baja California peninsula.

September 21

- 00:00 UTC (2:00 p.m. HST, September 20) at 16.0°N 160.2°W – Tropical Depression Marie is last noted as a tropical cyclone while located about 395 mi (640 km) south-southwest of Honolulu, Hawaii, dissipating shortly thereafter.

September 23

- 12:00 UTC (5:00 a.m. PDT) at 12.5°N 108.5°W – Tropical Depression Nineteen-E develops from an area of unsettled weather while located about 725 mi (1,165 km) south of the southern tip of the Baja California peninsula.

September 24

- 06:00 UTC (11:00 p.m. PDT, September 23) at 12.8°N 111.6°W – Tropical Depression Nineteen-E strengthens into Tropical Storm Odile while located about 700 mi (1,130 km) south of the southern tip of the Baja California peninsula.

September 25

- 12:00 UTC (5:00 a.m. PDT) at 13.6°N 117.0°W – Tropical Storm Odile strengthens into a Category 1 hurricane while located about 790 mi (1,270 km) southwest of the southern tip of the Baja California peninsula.
- 18:00 UTC (11:00 a.m. PDT) at 13.9°N 118.3°W – Hurricane Odile strengthens to Category 2 intensity while located about 830 mi (1,335 km) southwest of the southern tip of the Baja California peninsula.

September 26

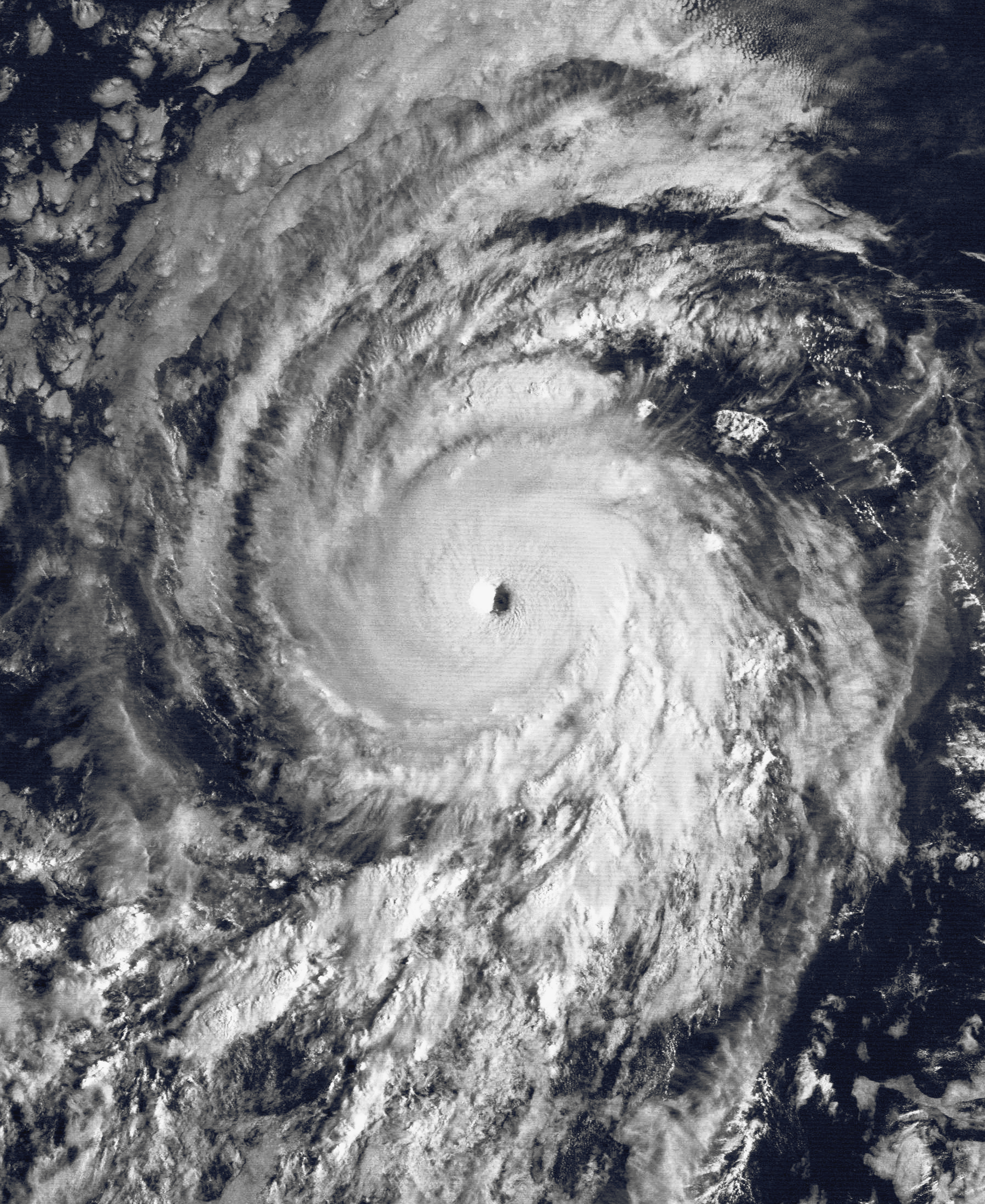
Hurricane Odile at peak intensity on September 26

- 06:00 UTC (11:00 p.m. PDT, September 25) at 14.7°N 120.9°W – Hurricane Odile strengthens to Category 3 intensity while located about 910 mi (1,465 km) southwest of the southern tip of the Baja California peninsula, making it the fifth major hurricane of the season.
- 12:00 UTC (5:00 a.m. PDT) at 15.2°N 122.1°W – Hurricane Odile strengthens to Category 4 intensity while located about 955 mi (1,535 km) southwest of the southern tip of the Baja California peninsula. It simultaneously attains its peak intensity, with maximum sustained winds of 145 mph (230 km/h) and a minimum central pressure of 935 mbar (27.61 inHg).

September 27

- 00:00 UTC (5:00 p.m. PDT, September 26) at 13.5°N 99.3°W – Tropical Depression Twenty-One-E (Note: Operationally, the NHC did not initiate advisories on Tropical Depression Twenty-One-E—future Tropical Storm Rachel—until 08:30 UTC (1:30 a.m. PDT) on September 30, by which time it was already a tropical storm. Advisories on Tropical Depression Twenty-E—future Hurricane Polo—had been initiated roughly 36 hours prior, resulting in that system receiving an earlier number despite forming after Twenty-One-E.) develops from a tropical wave while located about 235 mi (380 km) south of Acapulco.

September 28

- 00:00 UTC (5:00 p.m. PDT, September 27) at 18.9°N 127.8°W – Hurricane Odile weakens to Category 3 intensity while located about 1,180 mi (1,900 km) west-southwest of the southern tip of the Baja California peninsula.
- 06:00 UTC (11:00 p.m. PDT, September 27) at 19.5°N 128.2°W – Hurricane Odile weakens to Category 2 intensity while located about 1,195 mi (1,925 km) west of the southern tip of the Baja California peninsula.
- 18:00 UTC (11:00 a.m. PDT) at 20.6°N 128.7°W – Hurricane Odile weakens to Category 1 intensity while located about 1,215 mi (1,955 km) west of the southern tip of the Baja California peninsula.
- 18:00 UTC (11:00 a.m. PDT) at 9.7°N 137.1°W – Tropical Depression Twenty-E develops from a tropical wave while located about 2,010 mi (3,230 km) west-southwest of the southern tip of the Baja California peninsula.

September 29

- 06:00 UTC (11:00 p.m. PDT, September 28) at 21.2°N 128.7°W – Hurricane Odile weakens into a tropical storm while located about 1,205 mi (1,935 km) west of the southern tip of the Baja California peninsula.
- 18:00 UTC (11:00 a.m. PDT) at 13.3°N 138.3°W – Tropical Depression Twenty-E strengthens into Tropical Storm Polo while located about 1,970 mi (3,165 km) west-southwest of the southern tip of the Baja California peninsula.

September 30

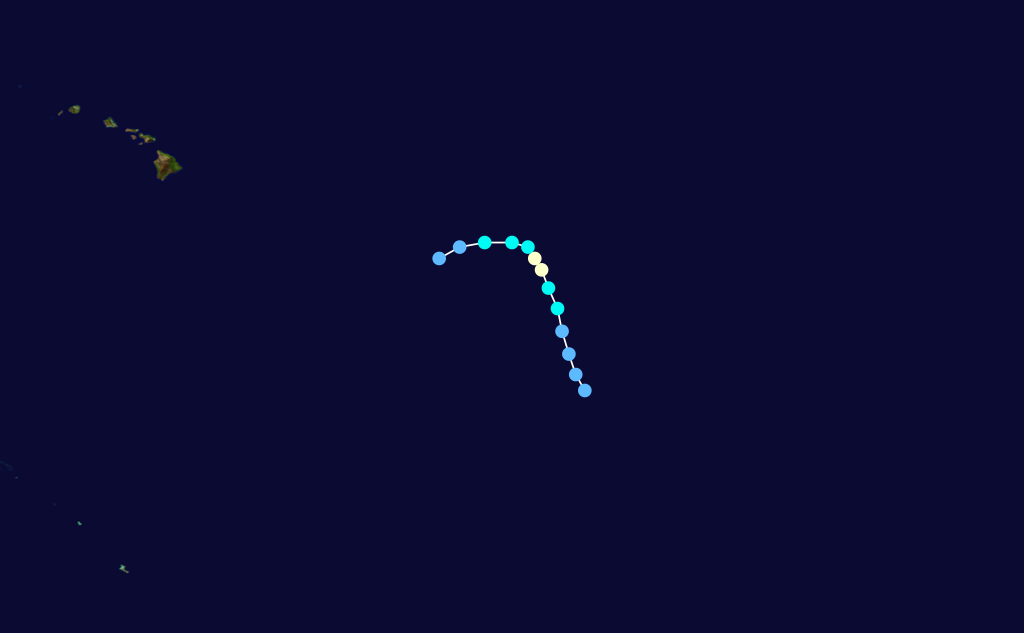
Storm track of Hurricane Polo

- 06:00 UTC (11:00 p.m. PDT, September 29) at 20.5°N 129.6°W – Tropical Storm Odile weakens into a tropical depression while located about 1,270 mi (2,045 km) west of the southern tip of the Baja California peninsula.
- 06:00 UTC (11:00 p.m. PDT, September 29) at 14.8°N 109.3°W – Tropical Depression Twenty-One-E strengthens into Tropical Storm Rachel while located about 560 mi (900 km) south of the southern tip of the Baja California peninsula.
- 06:00 UTC (11:00 p.m. PDT, September 29) at 15.0°N 139.0°W – Tropical Storm Polo strengthens into a Category 1 hurricane while located about 1,970 mi (3,165 km) west-southwest of the southern tip of the Baja California peninsula. It simultaneously attains its peak intensity, with maximum sustained winds of 75 mph (120 km/h) and a minimum central pessure of 987 mbar (29.15 inHg).
- 18:00 UTC (11:00 a.m. PDT) at 16.0°N 139.6°W – Hurricane Polo weakens into a tropical storm while located about 1,985 mi (3,195 km) west-southwest of the southern tip of the Baja California peninsula.

=== October ===
October 1

- 00:00 UTC (2:00 p.m. HST, September 30) at 16.3°N 140.4°W (Note: The Northeast and North Central Pacific hurricane database (HURDAT) places Polo at 16.2°N 140.3°W, or about 1,000 mi (1,610 km) east-southeast of Hilo.) – Tropical Storm Polo crosses 140°W into the Central Pacific basin while located about 990 mi (1,595 km) east-southeast of Hilo.
- 12:00 UTC (2:00 a.m. HST) at 16.0°N 141.5°W (Note: HURDAT places Polo at 16.0°N 142.6°W, or about 855 mi (1,380 km) east-southeast of Hilo.) – Tropical Storm Polo weakens into a tropical depression while located about 925 mi (1,490 km) east-southeast of Hilo.
- 18:00 UTC (8:00 a.m. HST) at 15.5°N 142.8°W (Note: HURDAT places Polo at 15.5°N 143.5°W, or about 815 mi (1,315 km) east-southeast of Hilo.) – Tropical Depression Polo is last noted as a tropical cyclone while located about 855 mi (1,380 km) east-southeast of Hilo, dissipating shortly thereafter.

October 2

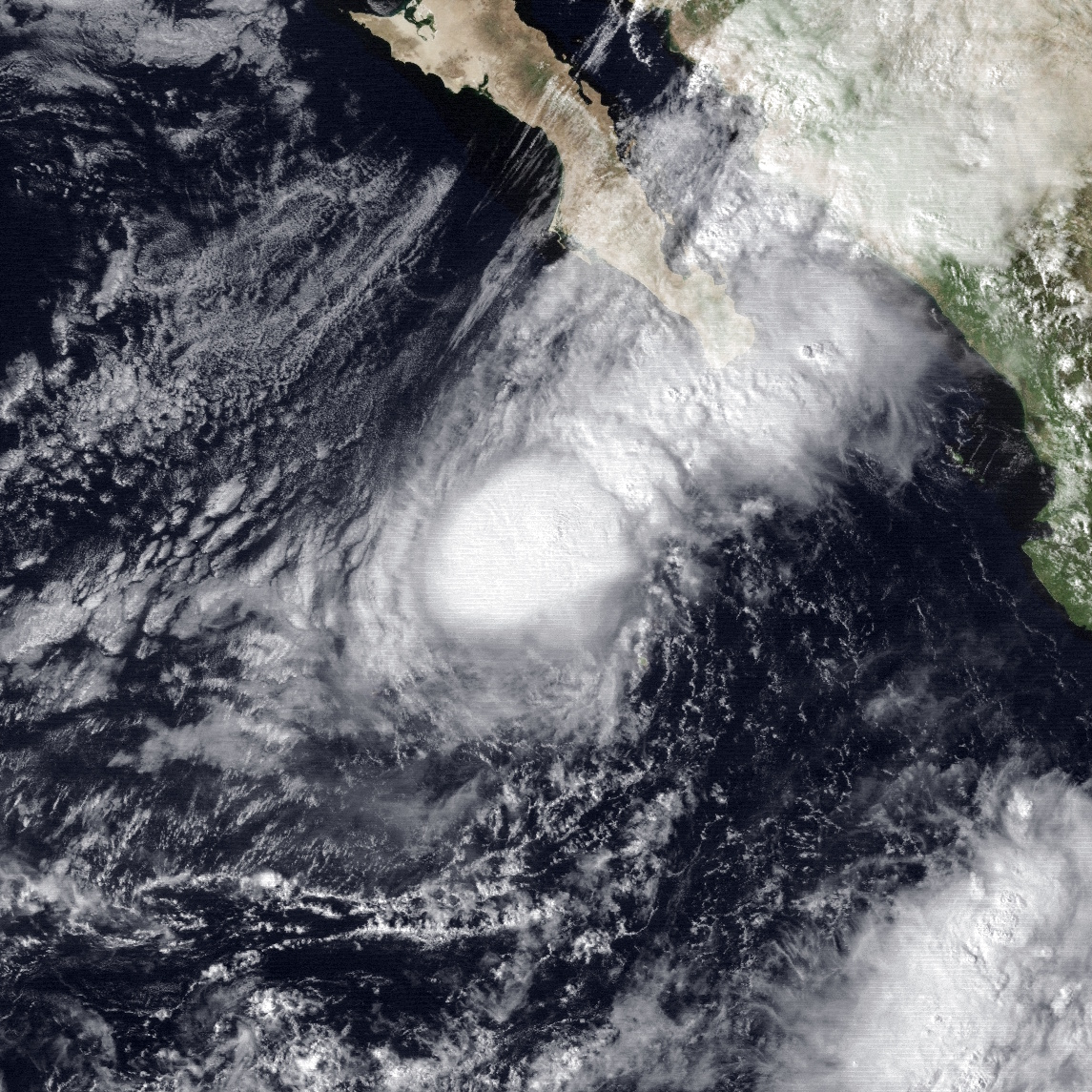
Tropical Storm Rachel gradually strengthening late on October 1

- 00:00 UTC (5:00 p.m. PDT, October 1) at 17.9°N 134.6°W – Tropical Depression Odile is last noted as a tropical cyclone while located about 1,630 mi (2,620 km) west of the southern tip of the Baja California peninsula, dissipating shortly thereafter.
- 06:00 UTC (11:00 p.m. PDT, October 1) at 21.6°N 111.4°W – Tropical Storm Rachel attains its peak intensity, with maximum sustained winds of 65 mph (100 km/h) and a minimum central pressure of 994 mbar (29.35 inHg), while located about 125 mi (205 km) southwest of the southern tip of the Baja California peninsula.
- 12:00 UTC (5:00 a.m. PDT) at 23.1°N 110.1°W – Tropical Storm Rachel makes its first landfall near the southern tip of the Baja California peninsula with maximum sustained winds of 65 mph (100 km/h) and a central pressure of 995 mbar (29.38 inHg), emerging over the Gulf of California shortly thereafter.
- 19:00 UTC (12:00 noon PDT) at 25.2°N 108.4°W – Tropical Storm Rachel makes its second and final landfall roughly midway between Los Mochis and Culiacán, Sinaloa, with maximum sustained winds of 60 mph (95 km/h) and a central pressure of 998 mbar (29.47 inHg).

October 3

- 00:00 UTC (5:00 p.m. PDT, October 2) at 28.5°N 105.0°W – Tropical Storm Rachel weakens into a tropical depression while located over land about 295 mi (470 km) north-northeast of Culiacán, dissipating shortly thereafter.

October 9

- 00:00 UTC (5:00 p.m. PDT, October 8) at 14.5°N 110.0°W – Tropical Depression Twenty-Two-E develops from a tropical wave while located about 580 mi (935 km) south of the southern tip of the Baja California peninsula.

October 10

- 00:00 UTC (5:00 p.m. PDT, October 9) at 15.4°N 114.7°W – Tropical Depression Twenty-Two-E strengthens into Tropical Storm Simon while located about 605 mi (970 km) south-southwest of the southern tip of the Baja California peninsula.

October 11

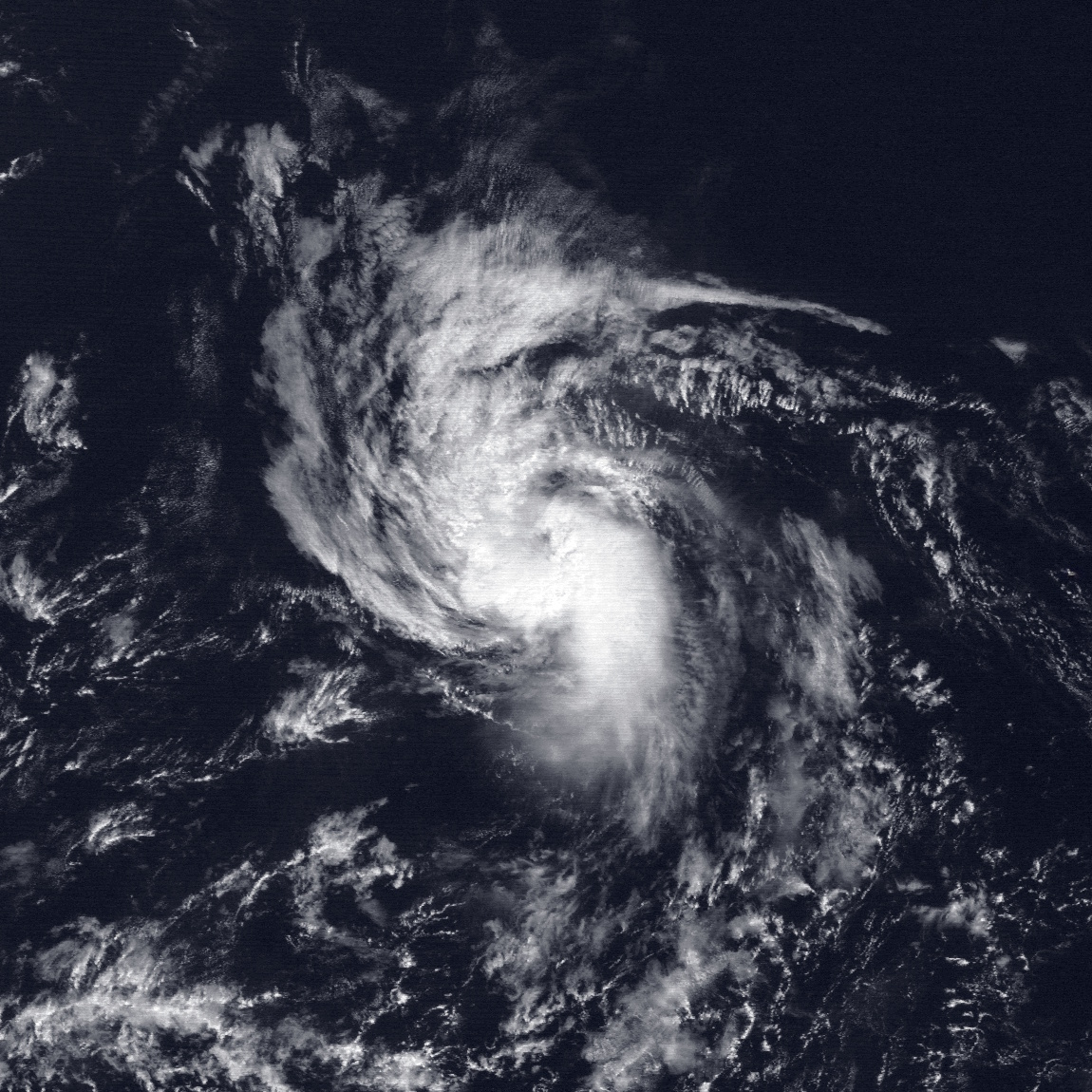
Tropical Storm Simon at peak intensity late on October 11

- 18:00 UTC (11:00 a.m. PDT) at 18.5°N 120.7°W – Tropical Storm Simon attains its peak intensity, with maximum sustained winds of 70 mph (110 km/h) and a minimum central pressure of 990 mbar (29.23 inHg), while located about 755 mi (1,215 km) west-southwest of the southern tip of the Baja California peninsula.

October 13

- 18:00 UTC (11:00 a.m. PDT) at 21.5°N 128.3°W – Tropical Storm Simon weakens into a tropical depression while located about 1,175 mi (1,890 km) west of the southern tip of the Baja California peninsula.

October 14

- 18:00 UTC (11:00 a.m. PDT) at 21.9°N 132.2°W – Tropical Depression Simon is last noted as a tropical cyclone while located about 1,420 mi (2,285 km) west of the southern tip of the Baja California peninsula, dissipating shortly thereafter.

October 16

- 00:00 UTC (5:00 p.m. PDT, October 15) at 10.3°N 99.4°W – Tropical Depression Twenty-Three-E develops from a tropical wave while located about 455 mi (730 km).

October 17

- 12:00 UTC (5:00 a.m. PDT) at 12.5°N 103.0°W – Tropical Depression Twenty-Three-E strengthens into Tropical Storm Trudy while located about 370 mi (595 km) southwest of Acapulco.

October 18

- 12:00 UTC (5:00 a.m. PDT) at 13.3°N 105.1°W – Tropical Storm Trudy strengthens into a Category 1 hurricane while located about 425 mi (685 km) southwest of Acapulco.

October 19

- 00:00 UTC (5:00 p.m. PDT, October 18) at 13.3°N 106.6°W – Hurricane Trudy strengthens to Category 2 intensity while located about 510 mi (825 km) west-southwest of Acapulco.
- 06:00 UTC (11:00 p.m. PDT, October 18) at 13.6°N 107.4°W – Hurricane Trudy strengthens to Category 3 intensity while located about 545 mi (880 km) west-southwest of Acapulco, making it the sixth and final major hurricane of the season.
- 18:00 UTC (11:00 a.m. PDT) at 14.5°N 109.2°W – Hurricane Trudy strengthens to Category 4 intensity while located about 580 mi (935 km) south of the southern tip of the Baja California peninsula.

October 20

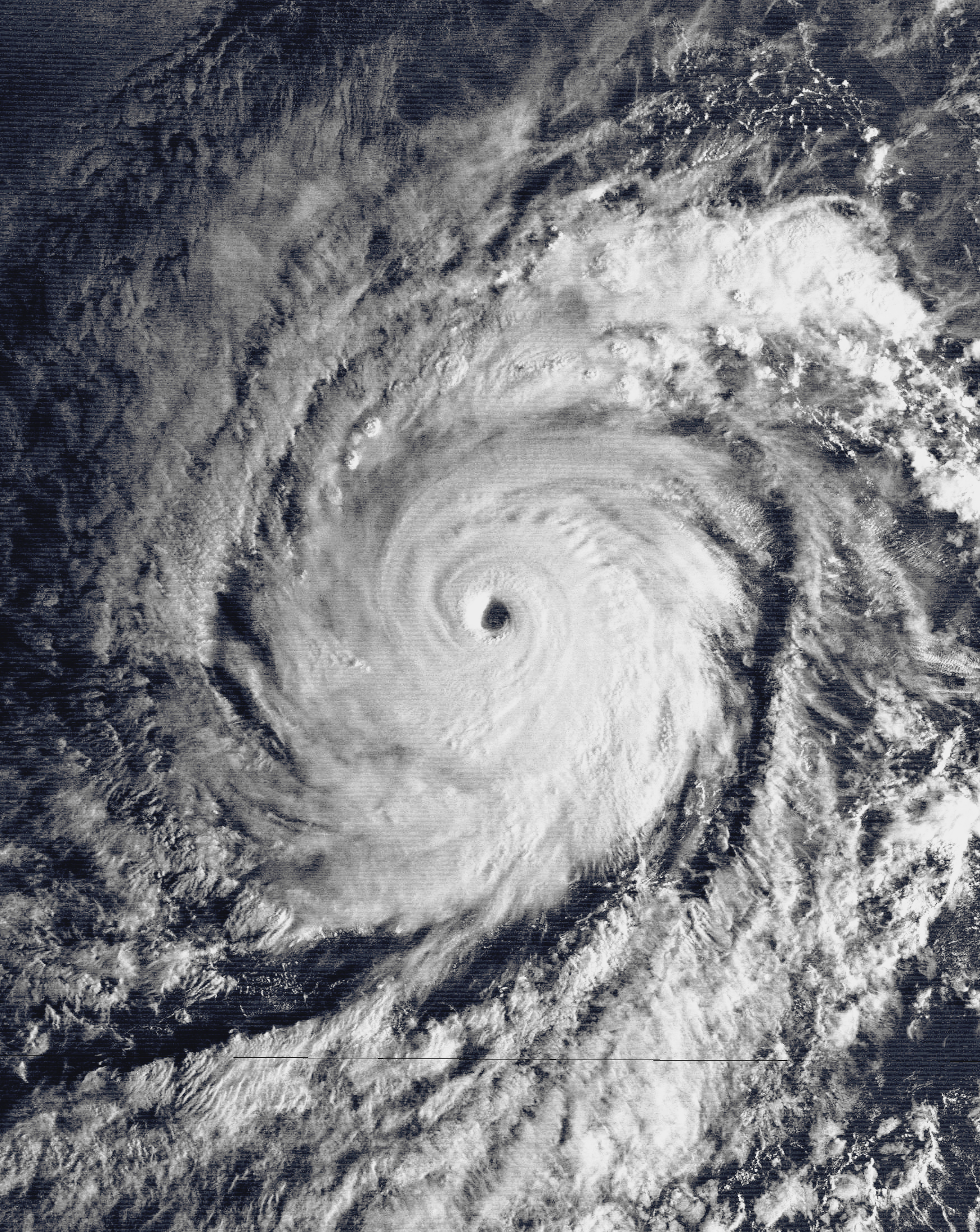
Hurricane Trudy near peak intensity on October 20

- 12:00 UTC (5:00 a.m. PDT) at 15.5°N 111.0°W – Hurricane Trudy attains its peak intensity, with maximum sustained winds of 155 mph (250 km/h) and a minimum central pressure of 924 mbar (27.29 inHg), while located about 510 mi (825 km) south of the southern tip of the Baja California peninsula, making it the strongest storm of the season.

October 21

- 12:00 UTC (5:00 a.m. PDT) at 16.5°N 111.3°W – Hurricane Trudy weakens to Category 3 intensity while located about 450 mi (720 km) south of the southern tip of the Baja California peninsula.
- 18:00 UTC (11:00 a.m. PDT) at 11.3°N 99.1°W – Tropical Depression Twenty-Four-E develops from an area of unsettled weather while located about 385 mi (620 km) south of Acapulco.

October 22

- 00:00 UTC (5:00 p.m. PDT, October 21) at 16.7°N 111.0°W – Hurricane Trudy weakens to Category 2 intensity while located about 430 mi (695 km) south of the southern tip of the Baja California peninsula.
- 18:00 UTC (11:00 a.m. PDT) at 17.4°N 111.1°W – Hurricane Trudy weakens to Category 1 intensity while located about 385 mi (620 km) south of the southern tip of the Baja California peninsula.

October 23

- 00:00 UTC (5:00 p.m. PDT, October 22) at 12.2°N 100.3°W – Tropical Depression Twenty-Four-E strengthens into Tropical Storm Vance while located about 320 mi (520 km) south of Acapulco.

October 25

- 00:00 UTC (5:00 p.m. PDT, October 24) at 17.1°N 115.7°W – Hurricane Trudy restrengthens to Category 2 intensity while located about 545 mi (880 km) southwest of the southern tip of the Baja California peninsula.
- 12:00 UTC (5:00 a.m. PDT) at 17.1°N 117.3°W – Hurricane Trudy restrengthens to Category 3 intensity while located about 620 mi (1,000 km) southwest of the southern tip of the Baja California peninsula.
- 12:00 UTC (5:00 a.m. PDT) at 16.8°N 106.5°W – Tropical Storm Vance strengthens into a Category 1 hurricane while located about 435 mi (705 km) west of Acapulco.

October 26

- 00:00 UTC (5:00 p.m. PDT, October 25) at 17.9°N 107.9°W – Hurricane Vance strengthens to Category 2 intensity while located about 370 mi (595 km) south-southeast of the southern tip of the Baja California peninsula. It simultaneously attains its peak intensity, with maximum sustained winds of 100 mph (155 km/h) and a minimum central pressure of 975 mbar (28.79 inHg).
- 06:00 UTC (11:00 p.m. PDT, October 25) at 17.5°N 119.3°W – Hurricane Trudy restrengthens to Category 4 intensity while located about 710 mi (1,140 km) west-southwest of the southern tip of the Baja California peninsula.

October 27

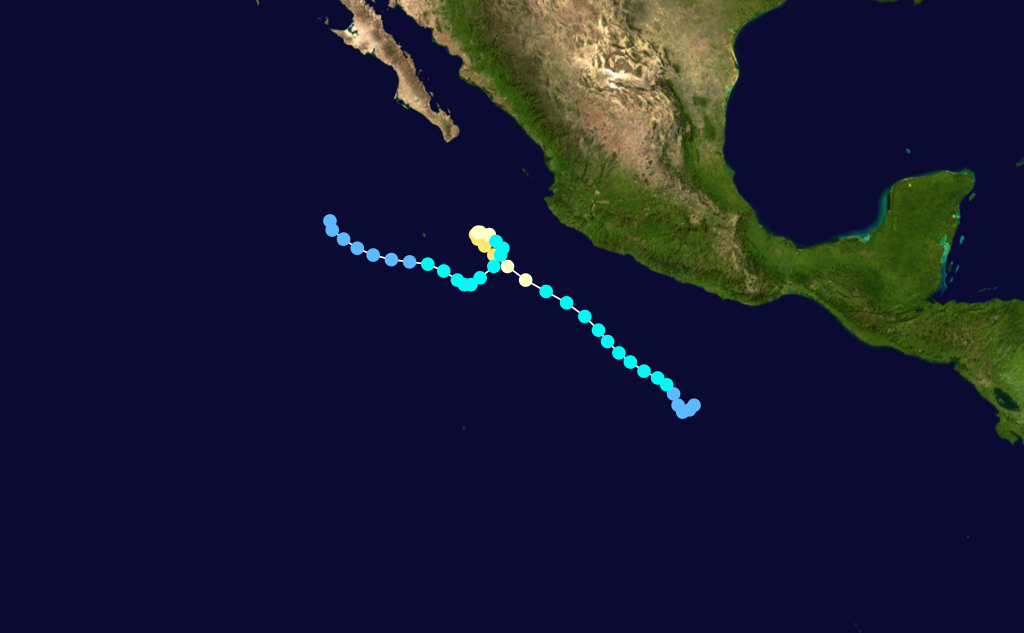
Storm track of late-season Hurricane Vance

- 00:00 UTC (5:00 p.m. PDT, October 26) at 18.9°N 108.6°W – Hurricane Vance weakens to Category 1 intensity while located about 290 mi (465 km) south-southeast of the southern tip of the Baja California peninsula.
- 18:00 UTC (11:00 a.m. PDT) at 18.1°N 121.8°W – Hurricane Trudy again weakens to Category 3 intensity while located about 835 mi (1,345 km) west-southwest of the southern tip of the Baja California peninsula.
- 18:00 UTC (11:00 a.m. PDT) at 18.5°N 107.8°W – Hurricane Vance weakens into a tropical storm while located about 335 mi (535 km) south-southeast of the southern tip of the Baja California peninsula.

October 28

- 12:00 UTC (5:00 a.m. PDT) at 18.3°N 122.6°W – Hurricane Trudy again weakens to Category 2 intensity while located about 875 mi (1,410 km) west-southwest of the southern tip of the Baja California peninsula.

October 29

- 00:00 UTC (5:00 p.m. PDT, October 28) at 18.7°N 123.0°W – Hurricane Trudy again weakens to Category 1 intensity while located about 890 mi (1,435 km) west-southwest of the southern tip of the Baja California peninsula.
- 18:00 UTC (11:00 a.m. PDT) at 19.7°N 123.3°W – Hurricane Trudy weakens into a tropical storm while located about 885 mi (1,425 km) west-southwest of the southern tip of the Baja California peninsula.

October 30

- 06:00 UTC (11:00 p.m. PDT, October 29) at 17.6°N 111.6°W – Tropical Storm Vance weakens into a tropical depression while located about 380 mi (610 km) south-southwest of the southern tip of the Baja California peninsula.

October 31

- 12:00 UTC (5:00 a.m. PDT) at 21.0°N 123.0°W – Tropical Storm Trudy weakens into a tropical depression while located about 845 mi (1,360 km) west of the southern tip of the Baja California peninsula.
- 18:00 UTC (11:00 a.m. PDT) at 19.4°N 115.1°W – Tropical Depression Vance is last noted as a tropical cyclone while located about 410 mi (655 km) southwest of the southern tip of the Baja California peninsula, dissipating shortly thereafter.

=== November ===
November 1

- 18:00 UTC (11:00 a.m. PDT) at 19.0°N 125.0°W – Tropical Depression Trudy dissipates while located about 1,005 mi (1,620 km) west-southwest of the southern tip of the Baja California peninsula.

November 30

- The 1990 Pacific hurricane season officially ends.

== See also ==
- Pacific hurricane season
- Timeline of the 1990 Atlantic hurricane season
- Timeline of the 1990–91 South Pacific cyclone season
