= List of storms named Rachel =

The name Rachel has been used for six tropical cyclones worldwide. Four in the Eastern Pacific, one in the Western Pacific, and one in the Southwest Pacific Ocean.

In the Eastern Pacific Ocean:

- Tropical Storm Rachel (1984) – formed in the open ocean
- Tropical Storm Rachel (1990) – made landfall in Mexico twice, caused 18 deaths
- Hurricane Rachel (2014) – Category 1 hurricane, no effect on land
- Hurricane Rachel (2026) – a Category 3 hurricane moved along the coast of Mexico and struck California as a post-tropical cyclone.

In the Western Pacific Ocean:

- Tropical Storm Rachel (1999) – struck Taiwan, and regenerated, before dissipating over the Yellow Sea

In the Southwest Pacific Ocean:

- Cyclone Rachel (1997) – Category 1-equivalent tropical cyclone that struck Port Hedland at peak intensity
