= Tropical Storm Rachel (1990) =

Pacific tropical storm in 1990

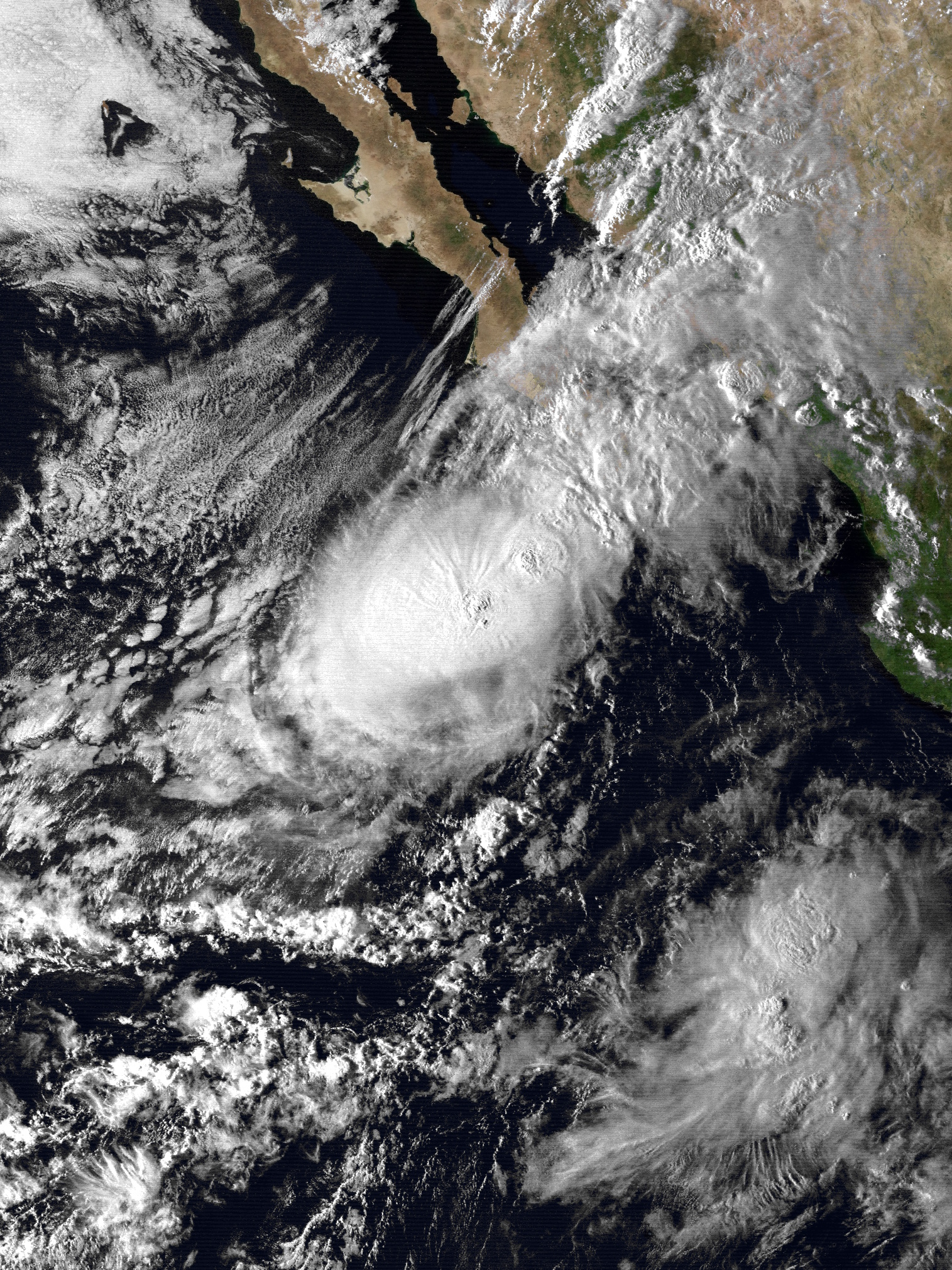
- Rachel near peak intensity while approaching Baja California Sur on October 2

Meteorological history
- Formed: September 27, 1990
- Dissipated: October 3, 1990

Tropical storm
- 1-minute sustained (SSHWS/NWS)
- Highest winds: 65 mph (100 km/h)
- Lowest pressure: 994 mbar (hPa); 29.35 inHg

Overall effects
- Fatalities: 18 direct
- Damage: Minimal
- Areas affected: Baja California Sur, Mainland Mexico, Texas
- IBTrACS
- Part of the 1990 Pacific hurricane season

Tropical Storm Rachel was the only tropical cyclone to make landfall during the 1990 Pacific hurricane season. The twenty-fourth tropical depression and eighteenth named storm, Rachel developed on September 27 from a tropical wave southwest of mainland Mexico. After becoming a tropical depression, the system tracked slowly southwestward and eventually curved northwestward. The depression intensified into a tropical storm after three days and was named Rachel by the National Hurricane Center. Rachel continued to steadily strengthen, and peaked as a strong 65 mph (100 km/h) tropical storm on October 2. After attaining peak intensity, Rachel re-curved to make a landfall in southern Baja California Sur and again in the Mexican Mainland on October 3. The storm produced heavy rainfall across northern Mexico and the Southwestern United States. Thousands of people were left homeless and 18 fatalities were reported.

== Meteorological history ==
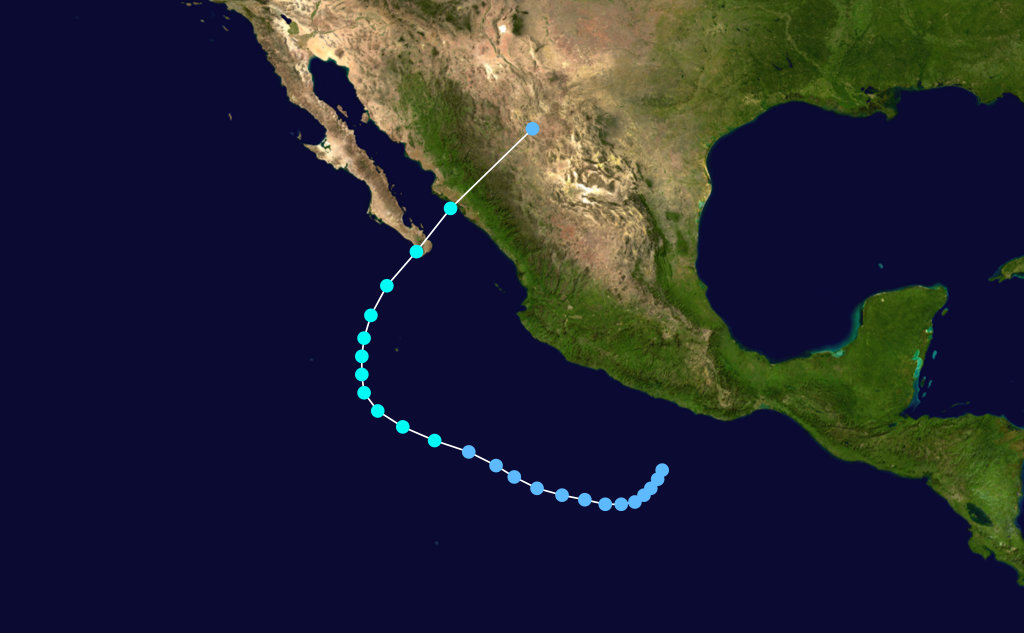
Map plotting the storm's track and intensity, according to the Saffir–Simpson scale Map key Saffir–Simpson scale Tropical depression (≤38 mph, ≤62 km/h) Tropical storm (39–73 mph, 63–118 km/h) Category 1 (74–95 mph, 119–153 km/h) Category 2 (96–110 mph, 154–177 km/h) Category 3 (111–129 mph, 178–208 km/h) Category 4 (130–156 mph, 209–251 km/h) Category 5 (≥157 mph, ≥252 km/h) Unknown Storm type Tropical cyclone Subtropical cyclone Extratropical cyclone, remnant low, tropical disturbance, or monsoon depression

The origins of Rachel can be traced back to a tropical wave that moved off the west coast Africa in mid-September 1990. It moved westward into the Caribbean Sea without significant development. Poorly organized, the wave entered the Eastern Pacific on overnight September 22. The thunderstorm activity became more concentrated two days later. Dvorak classifications, a technique used to estimate a tropical cyclone's intensity, began late September 25.

Early on September 27, the twenty-fourth tropical depression of the season had developed; however, operationally it was not warned upon until the system was located 540 mi (870 km) south of Baja California Sur on September 30. Post-analysis later confirm that Rachel was already a minimal tropical storm by that time. Although convection initially remained displaced from the center, Rachel steadily intensified. Early on September 30, the National Hurricane Center (NHC) operationally upgraded the depression into Tropical Storm Rachel. While intensifying, an upper-level trough over California allowed Rachel to re-curve towards Mexico. On October 2, it reached its peak intensity of 65 mph (100 km/h) and a minimum pressure of 994 mbar (hPa; 29.35 inHg).

After maintaining its intensity for 24 hours, Rachel made landfall at peak intensity near the southern tip of Baja California Sur. Strong wind shear prevented additional intensification, despite moving into the warm waters of the Gulf of California. After weakening slightly, Rachel made a second landfall midway between Las Mochis and Culiacán. Upon moving inland, the system rapidly weakened as the forward speed increased. Rachel dissipated several hours later on October 3. By that time, the winds had decreased to 30 mph (45 km/h). The remnants of Rachel entered the United States, and were last noted over Texas.

== Preparations and impact ==
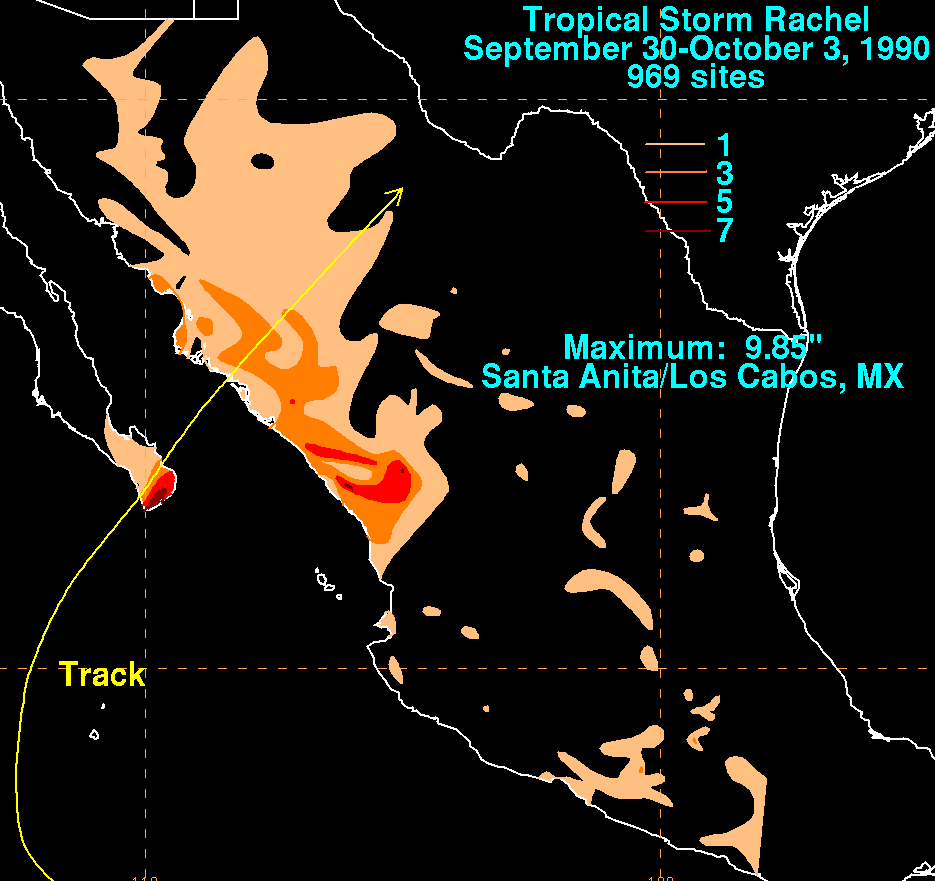
Rainfall map of Tropical Storm Rachel

Prior to the arrival of Rachel, the Mexican government issued a tropical storm watch for southern Baja California Sur, encompassing areas south of La Paz on October 1. As Rachel moved closer to the area, the watch was replaced with a tropical storm warning. In the mainland, a tropical storm watch was issued for the state of Sinaloa south of Los Mmochis. Six hours later, the watches was replaced with a tropical storm warning. By the end of October 2, all the watches and warnings were discontinued.

The two highest rainfall totals were 9.85 in (250 mm) and 6.5 in (170 mm) at Santa Anita and San Jose Del Cobe, near the southern tip of Baja California Sur. Two weather stations in Mexico reported barometric pressure of 1005 and 1006 mbar (hPa; 29.68 and 29.71 inHg) during the passage of Rachel. In all, precipitation was measured at 996 different places across the country. Throughout northern Mexico, significant flooding was reported with the worst effects felt in the states of Nuevo Leon, Coahuila and Durango. Thousands were homeless, and 18 people died. In Monterrey, rescue workers freed dozens of trapped people.

The moisture associated with the Rachel and a cold front produced rainfall in Arizona, New Mexico, and western Texas, while it was located southwest of Baja California Sur. After Rachel had dropped heavy rains, a flash flood watch was issued for several counties in New Mexico on October 1, where rainfall had reportedly been 2 in (51 mm) since the last day of September. The remnants of the storm produced additional precipitation across the state. Heavy rains fell on almost all of western Texas, and a flash flood warning had been issued after some areas experienced rainfall over 1 in (25 mm). With heavy rains falling in the western portion of Texas, some roads were washed out, especially in Big Bend National Park and Lubbock; several car accidents were also reported on the roads. Several locations in Texas measured at least 0.5 in (13 mm) of rain, and the highest amount of rainfall was 1.5 in (38 mm) in Lubbock.

== See also ==
- 1990 Pacific hurricane season
- Other storms of the same name
