= List of the wettest tropical cyclones in the United States =

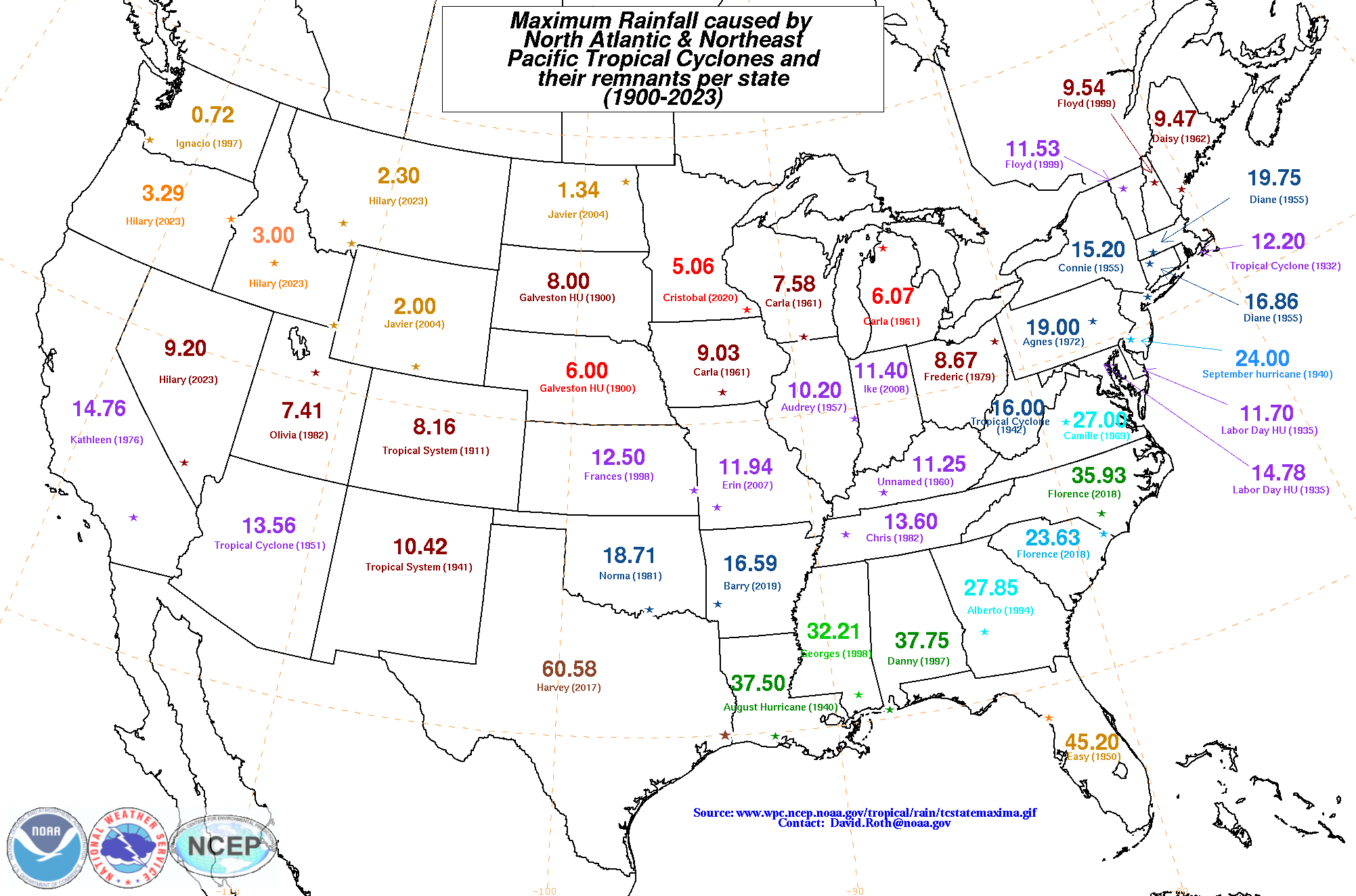
Contiguous U.S. tropical cyclone rainfall maximum per state as of 2023

Tropical cyclones move into the contiguous United States from the Atlantic Ocean, the Gulf of Mexico, and the eastern Pacific Ocean. The highest rainfall totals in the country have been measured across the Gulf Coast and lower portions of the Eastern Seaboard. Intermediate amounts have been measured across the Southwest, New England, and the Midwest. The northern Great Plains and Pacific Northwest have received the lowest amounts, as those regions lie exceptionally far from the breeding grounds of Atlantic and Eastern Pacific tropical cyclones.

The wettest tropical cyclone in the United States storm on record is Hurricane Harvey, which dumped 60.58 in (1,539 mm) of rain on Southeast Texas in 2017. Tropical Storm Claudette holds the national 24-hour rainfall record: 42.00 in (1,067 mm) in Alvin, Texas.

== Overall wettest ==
Precipitation in Nederland, Texas in 2017

The 10 highest rainfall amounts from tropical cyclones in the United States since 1950, including territories.

Wettest tropical cyclones and their remnants in the United States Highest-known totals
Precipitation			Storm	Location	Ref.
Rank	mm	in	Storm	Location	Ref.
1	1538.7	60.58	Harvey 2017	Nederland, Texas	
2	1473	58.00	Lane 2018	Kahūnā Falls, Hawaii	
3	1321	52.00	Hiki 1950	Kanalohuluhulu Ranger Station, Hawaii	
4	1219	48.00	Amelia 1978	Medina, Texas	
5	1148	45.20	Easy 1950	Yankeetown, Florida	
6	1143	45.00	Claudette 1979	Alvin, Texas	
7	1125	44.29	Imelda 2019	Fannett 2 SSW, Texas	
8	1106	43.54	Lala 2026	Laupāhoehoe, Hawaii	
9	1058.7	41.68	Fifteen 1970	Jayuya, Puerto Rico	
10	1033	40.68	Allison 2001	Northwest Jefferson County, Texas	

== Overall wettest in the contiguous United States ==
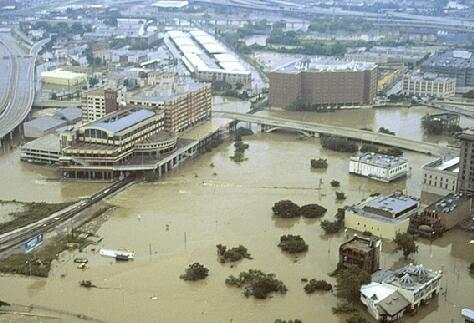
Flooding due to Allison in Houston, Texas in 2001

The 10 highest rainfall amounts from tropical cyclones in the contiguous United States since 1950. Amelia 1978 held the record until Hurricane Harvey dropped 60.58 inches (1538.7 mm) in 2017.

Wettest tropical cyclones and their remnants on the United States Mainland Highest-known totals
Precipitation			Storm	Location	Ref.
Rank	mm	in	Storm	Location	Ref.
1	1539	60.58	Harvey 2017	Nederland, Texas	
2	1219	48.00	Amelia 1978	Medina, Texas	
3	1148	45.20	Easy 1950	Yankeetown, Florida	
4	1143	45.00	Claudette 1979	Alvin, Texas	
5	1125	44.29	Imelda 2019	Fannett 2 SSW, Texas	
6	1033	40.68	Allison 2001	Northwest Jefferson County, Texas	
7	976.9	38.46	Georges 1998	Munson, Florida	
8	932.4	36.71	Danny 1997	Dauphin Island Sea Lab, Alabama	
9	912.6	35.93	Florence 2018	Elizabethtown, North Carolina	
10	781.8	30.78	Helene 2024	Busick, North Carolina	

== Alabama ==
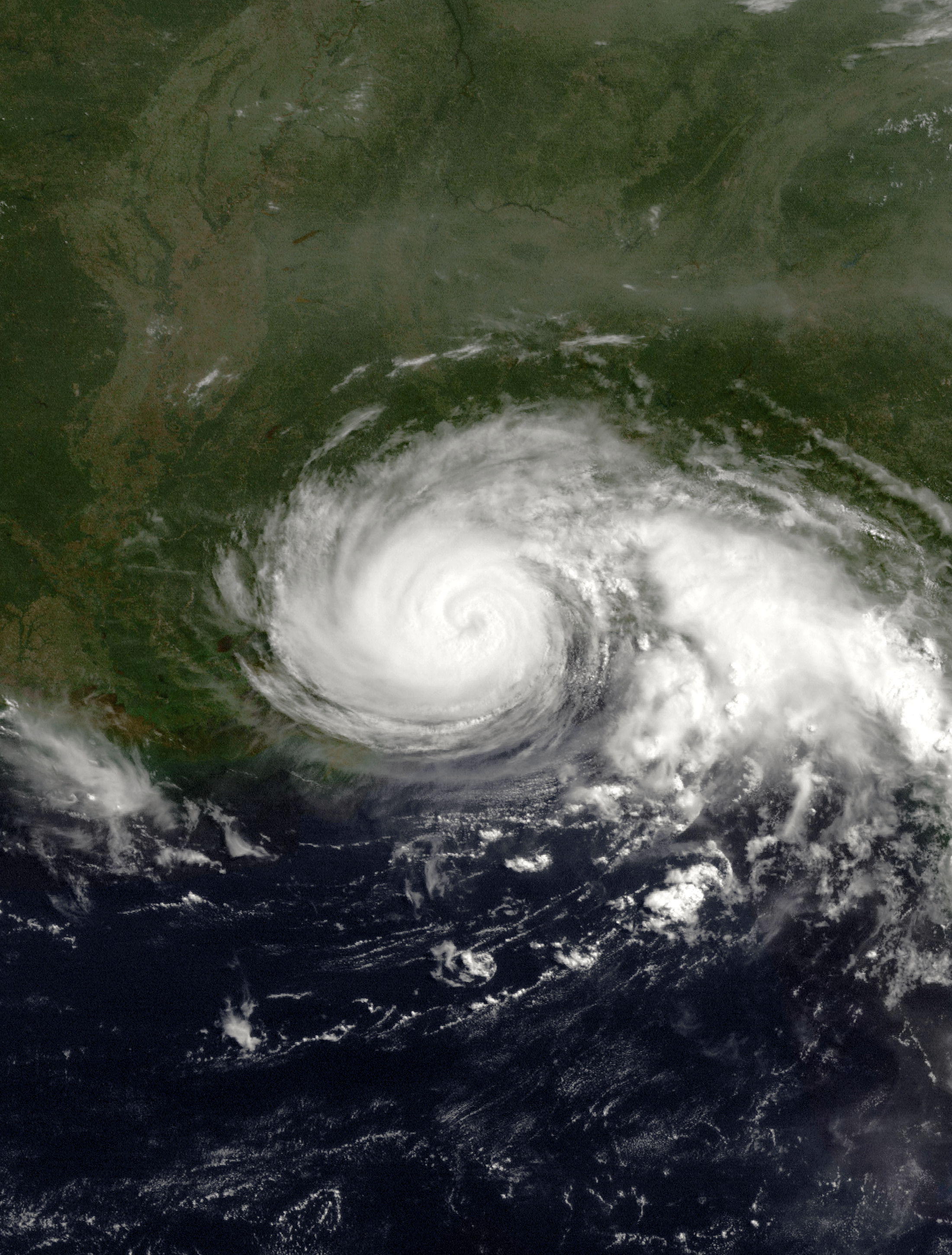
Hurricane Danny (1997)

The wettest tropical cyclone to hit the state of Alabama was Hurricane Danny, which stalled over Mobile Bay for over 24 hours.

Wettest tropical cyclones and their remnants in Alabama Highest-known totals
Precipitation			Storm	Location	Ref.
Rank	mm	in	Storm	Location	Ref.
1	932.4	36.71	Danny 1997	Dauphin Island Sea Lab	
2	761.7	29.99	Sally 2020	Orange Beach	
3	753.4	29.66	Georges 1998	Bay Minette	
4	574.8	22.63	Alberto 1994	Enterprise 5 NNW	
5	493.3	19.42	Opal 1995	Brewton 3 ENE	
6	469.9	18.50	1926 Miami hurricane	Bay Minette	
7	428.0	16.85	Debbie 1965	Mobile	
8	420.6	16.56	Unnamed 1987	Brewton 3 SSE	
9	408.7	16.09	Beryl 1988	Dauphin Island #2	
10	393.7	15.50	Tropical Storm Two 1931	Seven Hill	

== Alaska ==
No storm has ever affected Alaska as a tropical cyclone, but extratropical remnants of tropical cyclones have brought heavy rainfall to the state. Examples include the extratropical remnants of Hurricane Fico in 1978.

== American Samoa ==
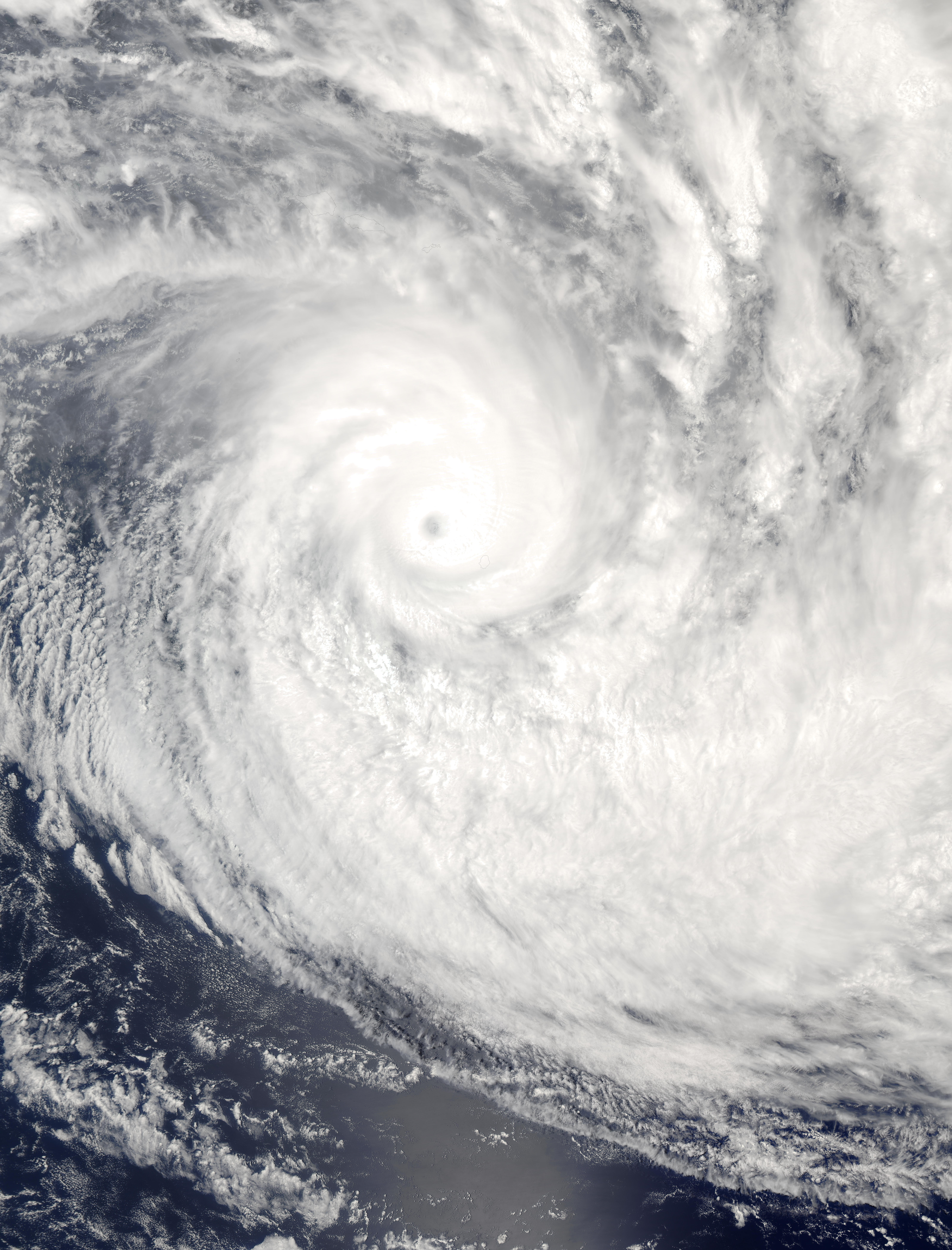
Cyclone Heta (2004)

Tropical cyclones affect the island chain with tropical storm-force winds once every three years, on average. The wettest known cyclone to affect the island group occurred early in 1966, when nearly 19 inches (480 mm) fell at Vaipito.

Wettest tropical cyclones and their remnants in American Samoa Highest-known totals
Precipitation			Storm	Location	Ref.
Rank	mm	in	Storm	Location	Ref.
1	472.4	18.60	Unnamed 1966	Vaipito	
2	445.5	17.54	Val 1991	Pago Pago Airport	
3	394.7	15.54	Ofa 1990	Aasufou	
4	359.9	14.17	Heta 2004	Aasufou	
5	254.5	10.02	Olaf 2005	Aasufou	
6	242.8	9.56	Wilma 2011	NWS Pago Pago	
7	212.1	8.35	Esau 1981	Aasufou	
8	198.1	7.80	Tuni 2015	Tafuna	
8	118.0	4.65	Nisha 2010	NWS Pago Pago	
9	95.5	3.76	Keli 1997	Afono	

== Arizona ==
A weakening Tropical Storm Nora over Arizona on September 23, 1997

Hurricane Nora was the last tropical cyclone to enter the United States from Mexico at tropical storm strength. The rainfall which fell across the Harquahala Mountains led to the state's 24-hour rainfall record.

Wettest tropical cyclones and their remnants in Arizona Highest-known totals
Precipitation			Storm	Location	Ref.
Rank	mm	in	Storm	Location	Ref.
1	344.4	13.56	Unnamed 1951	Crown King	
1	305.1	12.01	Nora 1997	Harquahala Mountains	
2	304.8	12.00	Octave 1983	Mount Graham	
3	289.6	11.40	Norma 1970	Workman Creek	
4	210.8	8.30	Heather 1977	Nogales	
5	209.8	8.26	Unnamed 1926	Hereford	
6	178.6	7.03	Unnamed 1939	Wikieup	
7	178.1	7.01	Doreen 1977	Yuma Valley	
8	177.8	7.00	Javier 2004	Walnut Creek	
9	166.9	6.57	Newton 2016	Rincon Mountains	
10	158.8	6.25	Norbert 2014	Tempe 3.1 WSW	

== Arkansas ==
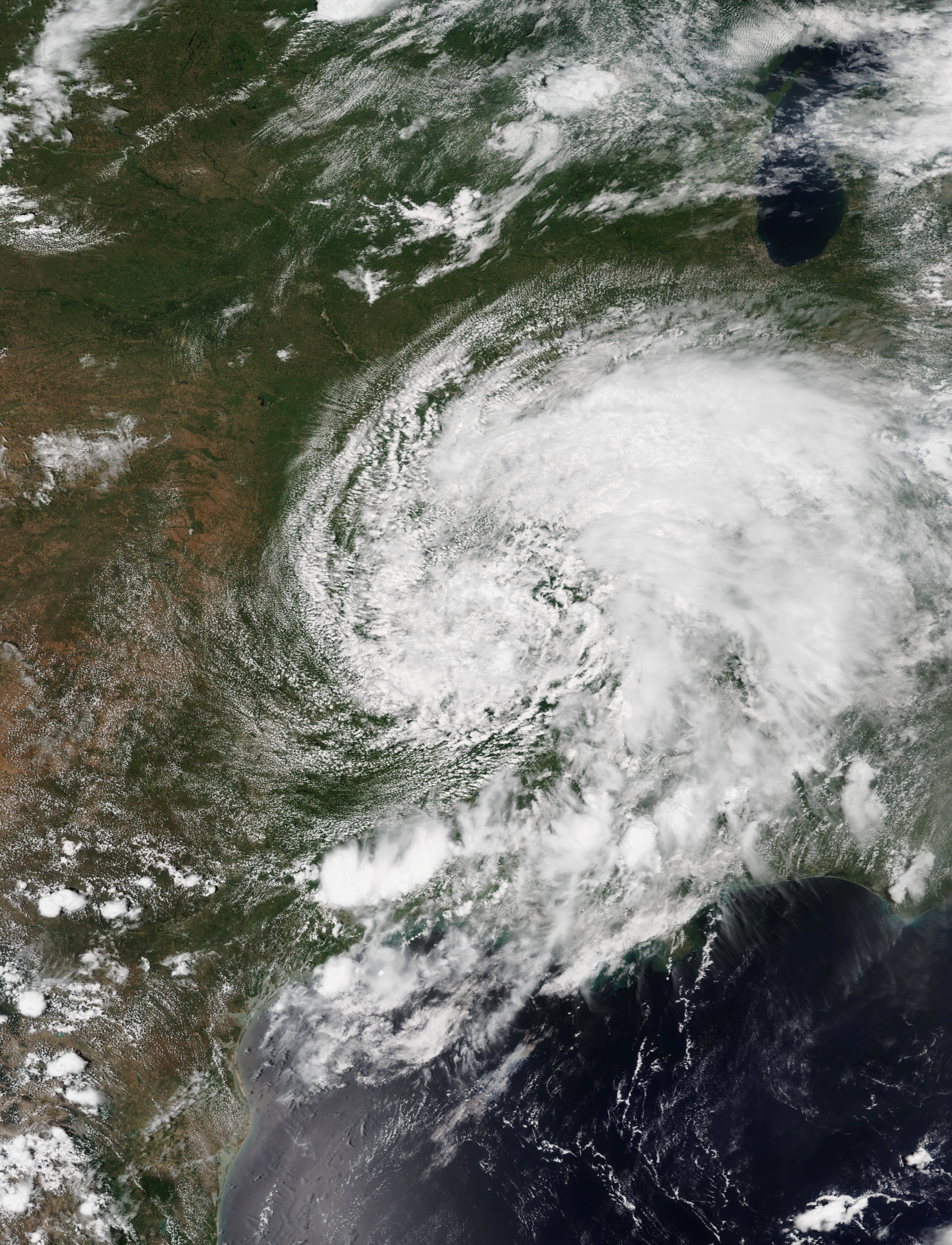
Remnants of Hurricane Barry over Arkansas on July 15, 2019

Although having weakened significantly by the time it reached the state, the slow movement of Hurricane Barry over Arkansas led to a widespread and significant flooding event. Murfreesboro saw the greatest rainfall accumulation at 14.58 inches (370.3 mm), which is the highest total ever recorded from a tropical cyclone in the state of Arkansas.

Wettest tropical cyclones and their remnants in Arkansas Highest-known totals
Precipitation			Storm	Location	Ref.
Rank	mm	in	Storm	Location	Ref.
1	421.4	16.59	Barry 2019	Dierks	
2	353.3	13.91	Allison 1989	Portland	
3	349.8	13.77	Bertha 1957	Damascus 2 NNE	
4	298.5	11.75	Bonnie 1986	El Dorado Regional AP	
5	298.2	11.74	Gustav 2008	Eudora/Bayou Macon	
6	286.8	11.29	Isaac 2012	White Hall 0.8 SE	
7	283.5	11.16	Unnamed 1960	Clarendon	
8	265.4	10.45	Frances 1998	Sparkman	
9	253.0	9.96	Harvey 2017	Watson 9 N	
10	248.9	9.80	Hurricane Two, 1942	Springbank	

== California ==
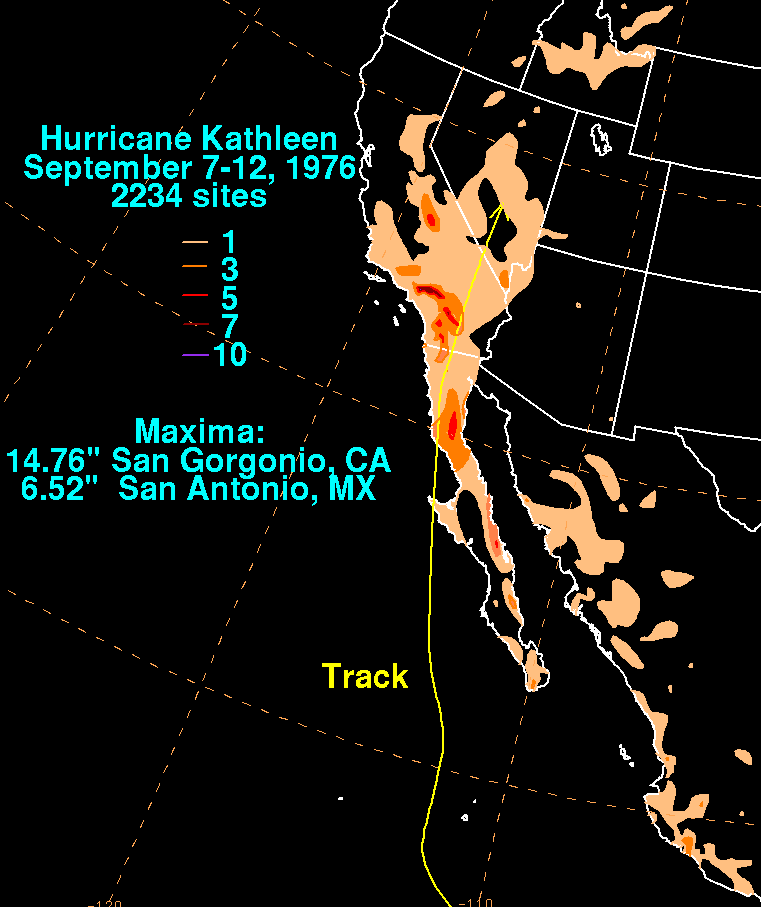
Hurricane Kathleen storm total rainfall map

One of six known eastern Pacific tropical cyclones to bring tropical storm-force winds to the Southwest, Hurricane Kathleen accelerated northward ahead of an upper-level trough, spreading heavy rains into the transverse ranges of southern California.

Wettest tropical cyclones and their remnants in California Highest-known totals
Precipitation			Storm	Location	Ref.
Rank	mm	in	Storm	Location	Ref.
1	374.9	14.76	Kathleen 1976	San Gorgonio	
2	298.2	11.74	Hilary 2023	Mount San Jacinto	
3	294.6	11.60	Unnamed 1939	Mount Wilson	
4	254.3	10.01	Unnamed 1918	Wrights	
5	189.2	7.45	Doreen 1977	Mount San Jacinto	
6	182.6	7.19	Olivia 1982	Grant Grove	
7	178.1	7.01	Norman 1978	Lodgepole	
8	112.3	4.42	Ivo 2013	Julian 5 SW	
9	105.2	4.14	Dolores 2015	Ramona	
10	88.14	3.47	Nora 1997	Beaumont 1 E	

== Colorado ==
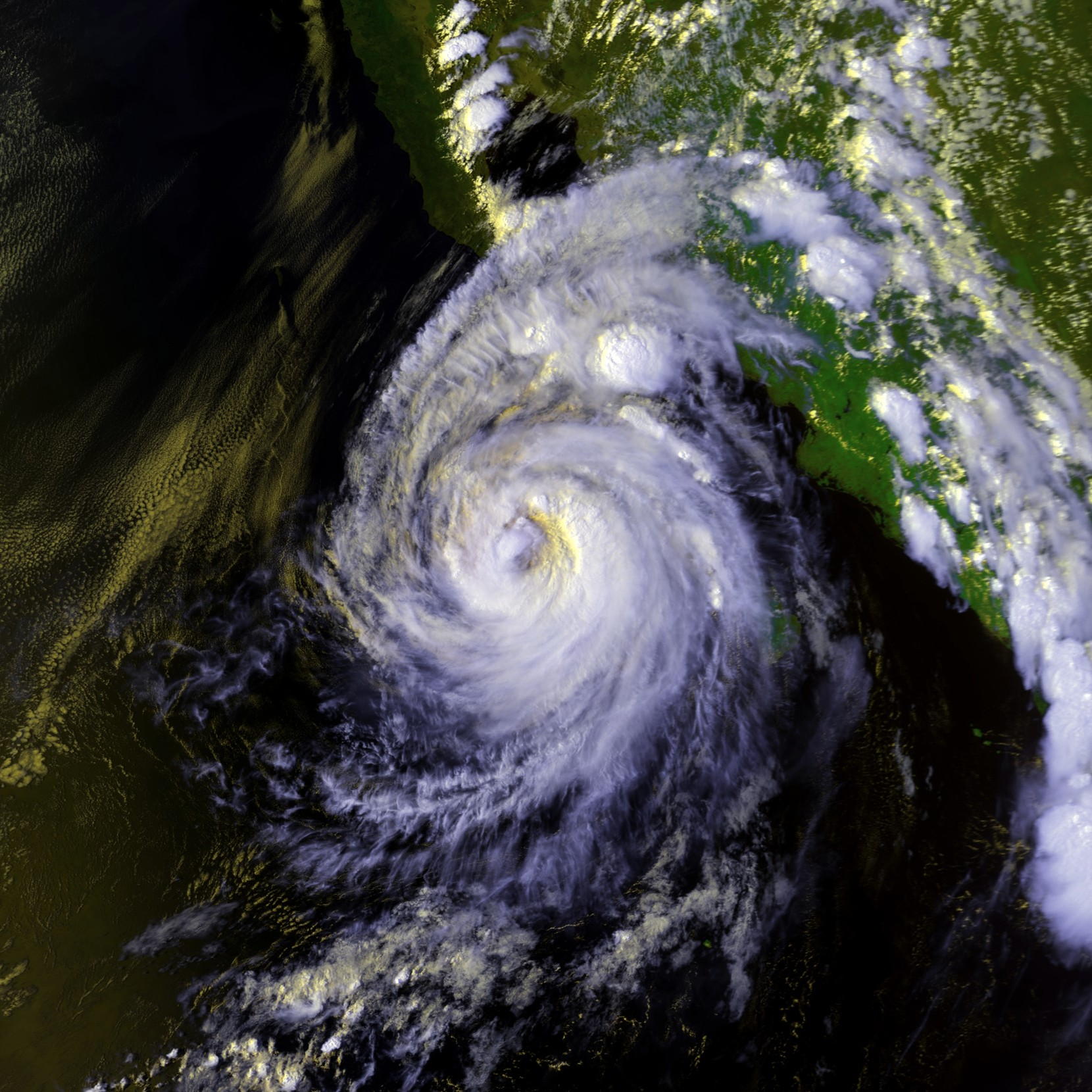
Hurricane Lester (1992)

Few tropical cyclone remnants originating from the eastern Pacific make it as far north as Colorado. Javier dropped locally heavy rainfall exceeding 4 inches (100 mm) over the higher terrain of western Colorado in 2004.

Wettest tropical cyclones and their remnants in Colorado Highest-known totals
Precipitation			Storm	Location	Ref.
Rank	mm	in	Storm	Location	Ref.
1	207	8.16	Unnamed (1911)	Gladstone	
2	135.9	5.35	Lester 1992	Wolf Creek Pass 1 E	
3	109.2	4.30	Javier 2004	Beartown	
4	68.6	2.70	Blanca 2015	Paonia 15 NW	
5	48.3	1.90	Dolly 2008	Her	

== Connecticut ==
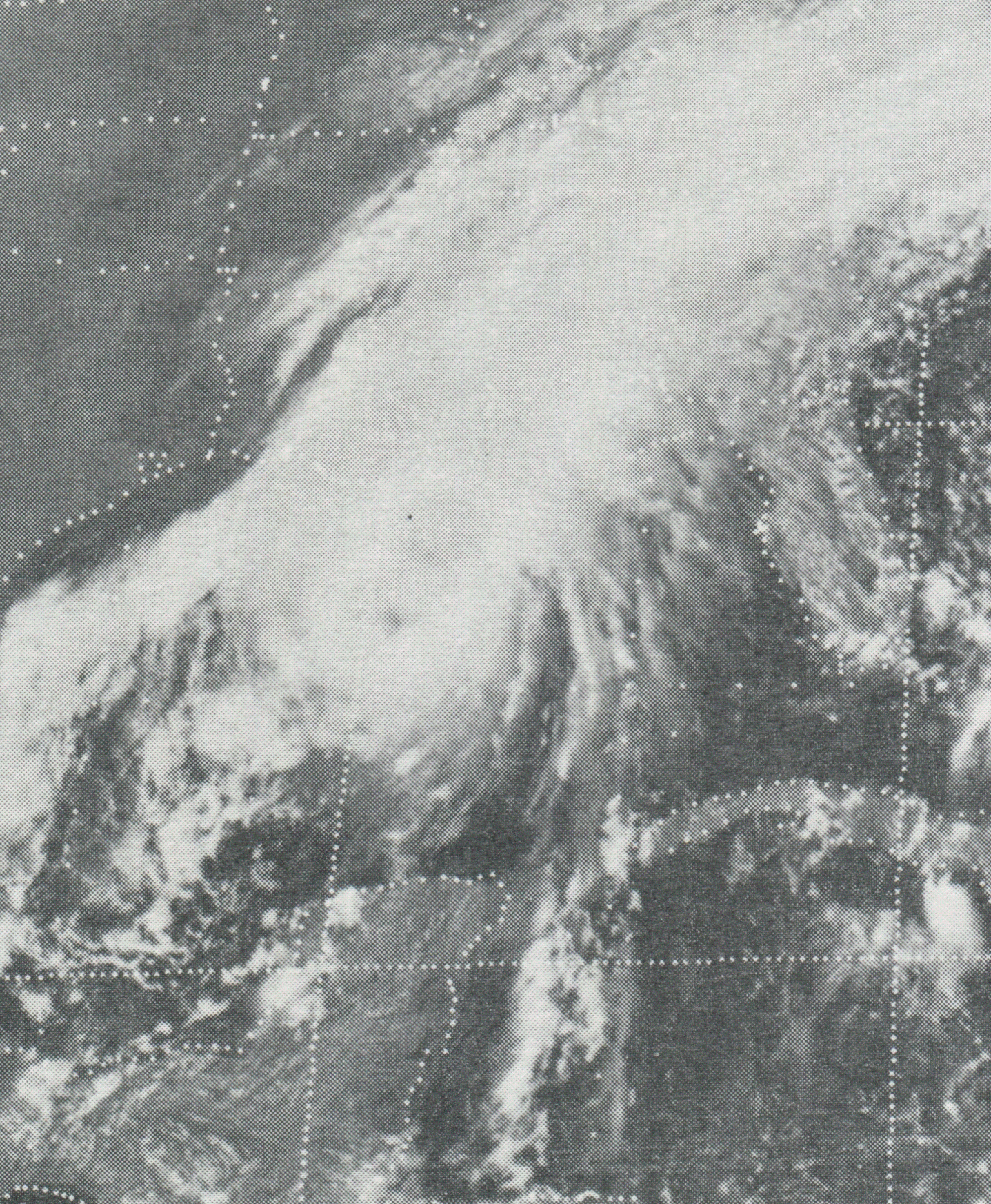
Hurricane Eloise (1975)

While Hurricane Diane is the wettest known tropical cyclone to impact New England, the 1938 New England hurricane produced the most rain in the state of Connecticut. Nonetheless, the flood from Hurricane Diane led to a significant death toll (nearly 200) from Pennsylvania eastward through southern New England.

Wettest tropical cyclones and their remnants in Connecticut Highest-known totals
Precipitation			Storm	Location	Ref.
Rank	mm	in	Storm	Location	Ref.
1	434.3	17.10	1938 New England hurricane	Buck	
2	428.2	16.86	Diane 1955	Torrington #2	
3	338.3	13.32	Eloise 1975	Mount Carmel	
4	289.6	11.40	Floyd 1999	West Hartford	
5	257.8	10.15	Irene 2011	New Hartford	
6	240.8	9.48	Connie 1955	Round Pond	
7	185.9	7.34	Donna 1960	Wolcott Reservoir	
8	176.5	6.95	Ida 2021	Middletown	
9	162.3	6.39	Lee 2011	Danbury	
10	158.0	6.22	Bob 1991	Norwich Public Utility Plant	

== Delaware ==
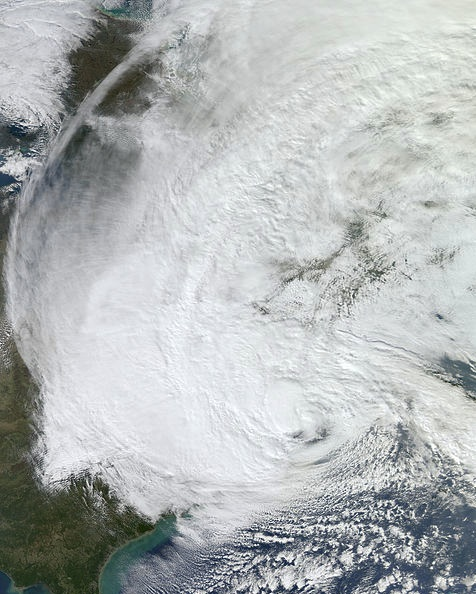
Hurricane Sandy

A large swath of heavy rainfall spread associated with a predecessor rainfall event fell before 1933 Chesapeake–Potomac hurricane arrived in Delaware. Over four days, a total of 13.2 inches (340 mm) of rain fell in Bridgeville, the most known associated with a tropical cyclone anywhere in Delaware.

Wettest tropical cyclones and their remnants in Delaware Highest-known totals
Precipitation			Storm	Location	Ref.
Rank	mm	in	Storm	Location	Ref.
1	335.3	13.20	1933 Chesapeake–Potomac hurricane	Bridgeville	
2	278.9	10.98	Sandy 2012	Indian River Inlet	
3	268.7	10.58	Floyd 1999	Greenwood 2 NE	
4	264.9	10.43	Irene 2011	Ellendale	
5	207.8	8.18	Connie 1955	Newark University Farm	
6	195.6	7.70	Donna 1960	Bridgeville 1 NW	
7	193.0	7.60	Agnes 1972	Middletown 3 E	
8	181.1	7.13	Danny 1985	Lewes	
9	177.0	6.97	Debby 2024	Newark	
10	174.5	6.87	Allison 1989	Wilmington New Castle	

== Florida ==
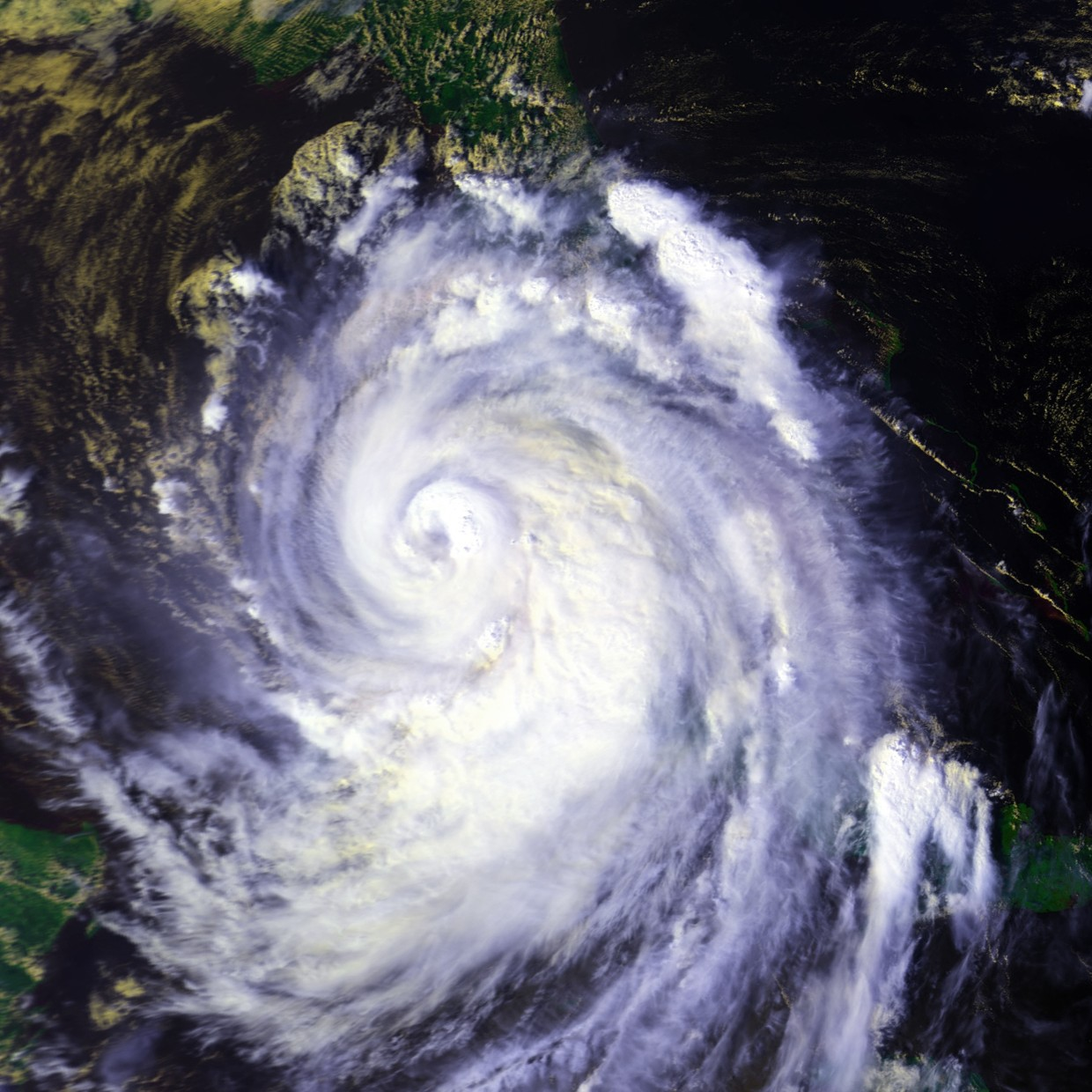
Hurricane Georges near the Florida Keys on September 25, 1998

The heaviest rainfall to occur in 24 hours was measured in Yankeetown during Hurricane Easy in 1950, which caused 38.70 inches (983 mm) of precipitation. This is also the highest known point storm total maximum related to any tropical cyclone which has impacted Florida, and by itself would be the highest known rainfall total for any month, or any 24 hour period, from any location within Florida. This rainfall amount remained the national 24-hour rainfall record until Tropical Storm Claudette's landfall in 1979.

Wettest tropical cyclones and their remnants in Florida Highest-known totals
Precipitation			Storm	Location	Ref.
Rank	mm	in	Storm	Location	Ref.
1	1148.1	45.20	Easy 1950	Yankeetown	
2	976.9	38.46	Georges 1998	Munson	
3	889.0	35.00	October Hurricane 1941	Trenton	
4	800.6	31.52	Ian 2022	Ponce Inlet	
5	762.0	30.00	Sally 2020	Pensacola	
6	731.0	28.78	Debby 2012	Curtis Mill	
7	702.3	27.65	Fay 2008	Melbourne/Windover Farms	
8	649.2	25.56	Dennis 1981	Homestead/Ira Ebersole	
9	635.0	25.00	TD 1, 1992	Arcadia Tower	
10	634.5	24.98	Jeanne 1980	Key West International Airport	

== Georgia ==
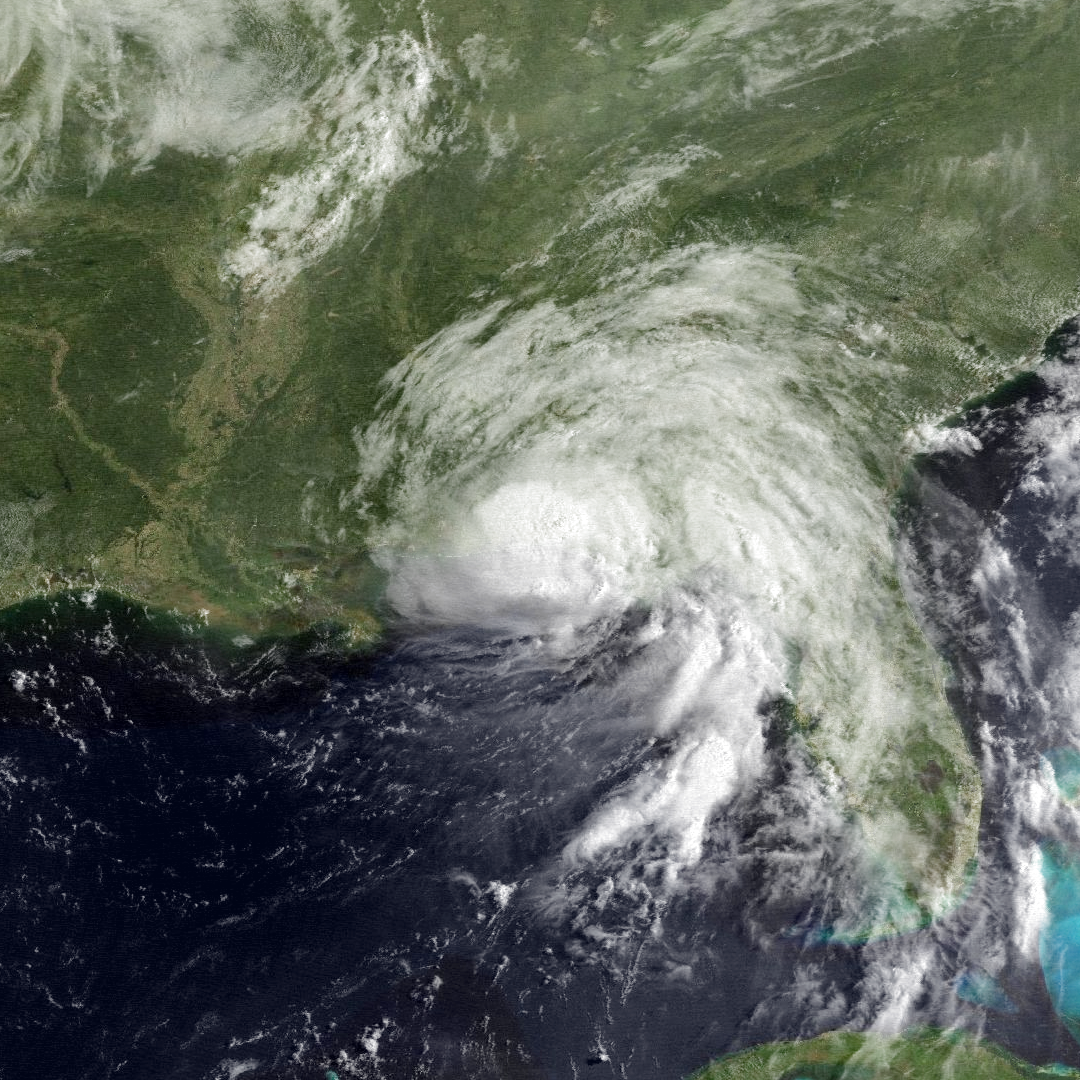
Alberto (1994)

Tropical Storm Alberto in 1994 looped across central Georgia, leading to 24-hour rainfall amounts exceeding 20 inches (510 mm) across central sections of the state. It also became the wettest tropical cyclone on record for the state of Georgia, eclipsing the record set in 1929.

Wettest tropical cyclones and their remnants in Georgia Highest-known totals
Precipitation			Storm	Location	Ref.
Rank	mm	in	Storm	Location	Ref.
1	707.4	27.85	Alberto 1994	Americus	
2	621.3	24.46	1929 Bahamas hurricane	Washington	
3	558.8	22.00	T. D. #29 1969	Attapulgus Mine	
4	541.0	21.30	Fay 2008	Thomasville 5 WNW	
5	508.0	20.00	1929 Bahamas hurricane	Glennville	
6	505.2	19.89	Marco 1990	Louisville 1E	
7	444.0	17.48	Matthew 2016	Savannah Hunter Field	
8	412.5	16.24	Easy 1950	Savannah Hunter Field	
9	395.2	15.56	Hanna 2002	Donalsonville	
10	376.4	14.82	Debby 2024	Oliver	

== Guam ==
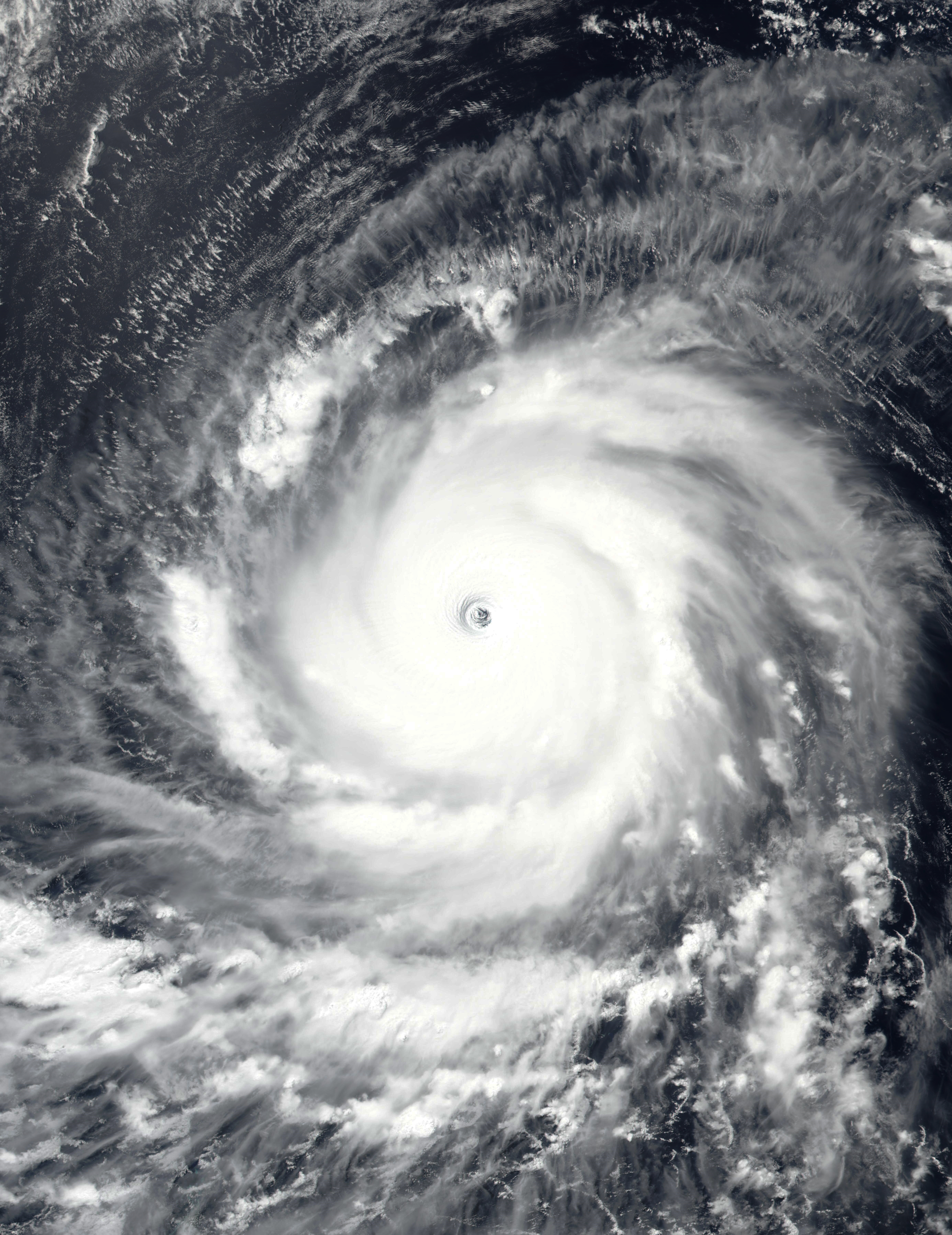
Typhoon Mawar (2023)

Super Typhoon Pamela was not only a wet tropical cyclone for the island of Guam, but a destructive one as well. Since Pamela, wooden structures across Guam have been largely replaced by concrete structures in order to better weather typhoons.

Wettest tropical cyclones and their remnants on Guam Highest-known totals
Precipitation			Storm	Location	Ref.
Rank	mm	in	Storm	Location	Ref.
1	856.0	33.70	Pamela 1976	Guam WSMO	
2	846.8	33.34	Alice 1953	Andersen Air Force Base	
3	840.5	33.09	Unnamed 1924	Guam WSMO	
4	771.9	28.42	Mawar 2023	Dededo	
5	650.5	25.61	Pongsona 2002	University of Guam	
6	610.4	24.03	Tingting 2004	Inarajan Agricultural Station	
7	539.5	21.24	Paka 1997	Guam WSMO	
8	533.0	21.00	Chataan 2002	South-central Guam	
9	519.2	20.44	Omar 1992	Guam WSMO	
10	423.9	16.69	Halong 2014	Andersen Air Force Base	

== Hawaii ==
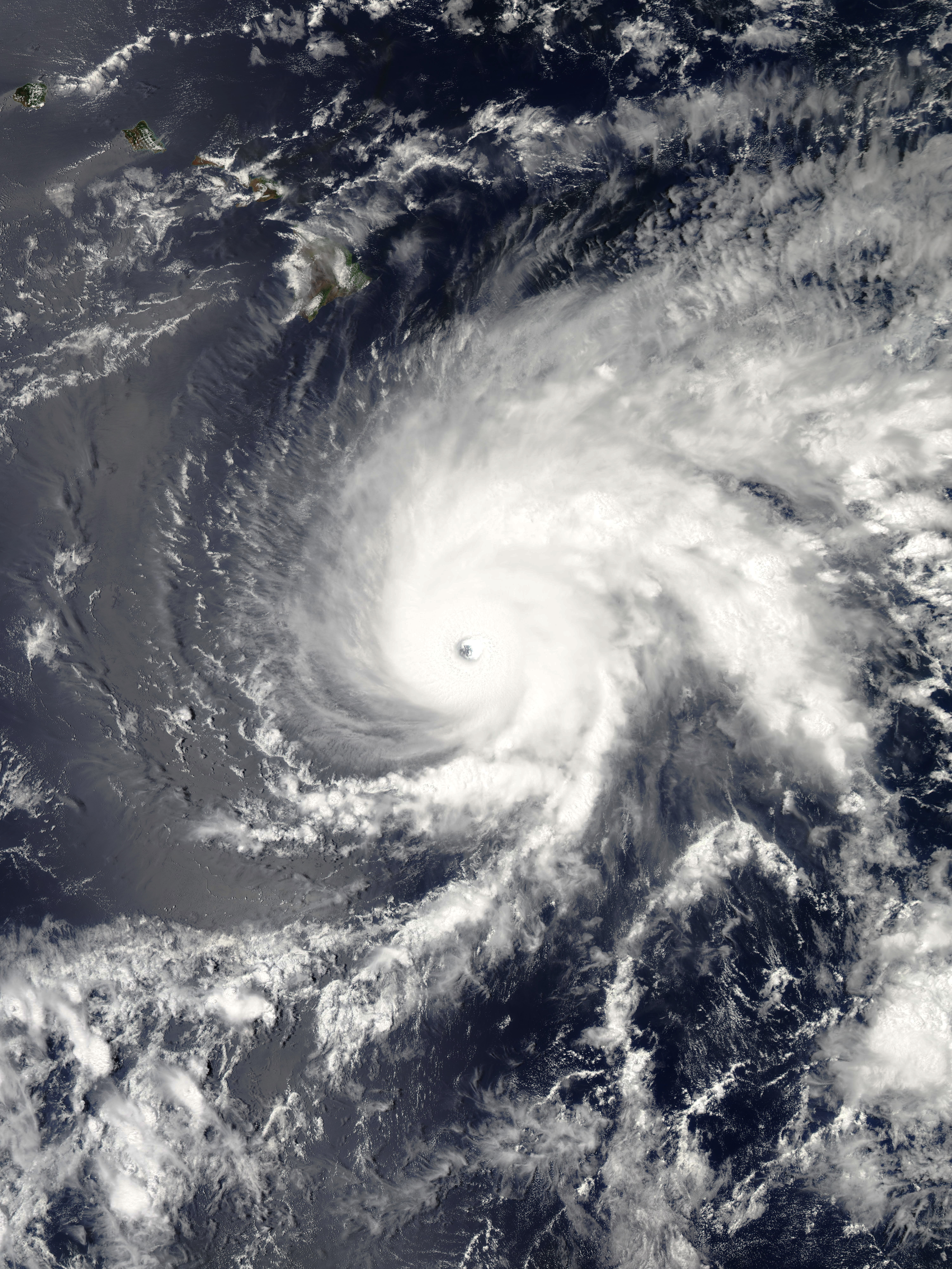
Hurricane Lane (2018)

This island state frequently sees rainfall from the remains of former eastern and central Pacific tropical cyclones. However, despite Hawaii's location in the subtropics, direct impacts by tropical cyclones are infrequent due to the protective influence of the Central Pacific tropical upper tropospheric trough (TUTT), which normally dissipates systems approaching Hawaii. Hurricane Hiki in 1950 led to significant rainfall in the mountains, with 52 inches (1,300 mm) of rainfall reported. This was the most rainfall reported to have been produced by a tropical cyclone within the United States until surpassed by Hurricane Harvey in 2017.

Wettest tropical cyclones and their remnants in Hawaii Highest-known totals
Precipitation			Storm	Location	Ref.
Rank	mm	in	Storm	Location	Ref.
1	1473	58.00	Lane 2018	Kahūnā Falls, Hawaii	
2	1321	52.00	Hiki 1950	Kanalohuluhulu Ranger Station	
3	1106	43.54	Lala 2026	Laupāhoehoe	
4	985	38.76	Paul 2000	Kapapala Ranch 36	
5	935	36.83	Nolo 2026	Mount Waiʻaleʻale	
6	635	25.00	Maggie 1970	Various stations	
7	536	21.11	Lowell 2026	Kilohana	
8	519	20.42	Nina 1957	Wainiha	
9	516	20.33	Iwa 1982	Intake Wainiha 1086	
10	476	18.75	Fabio 1988	Papaikou Mauka 140.1	

== Idaho ==
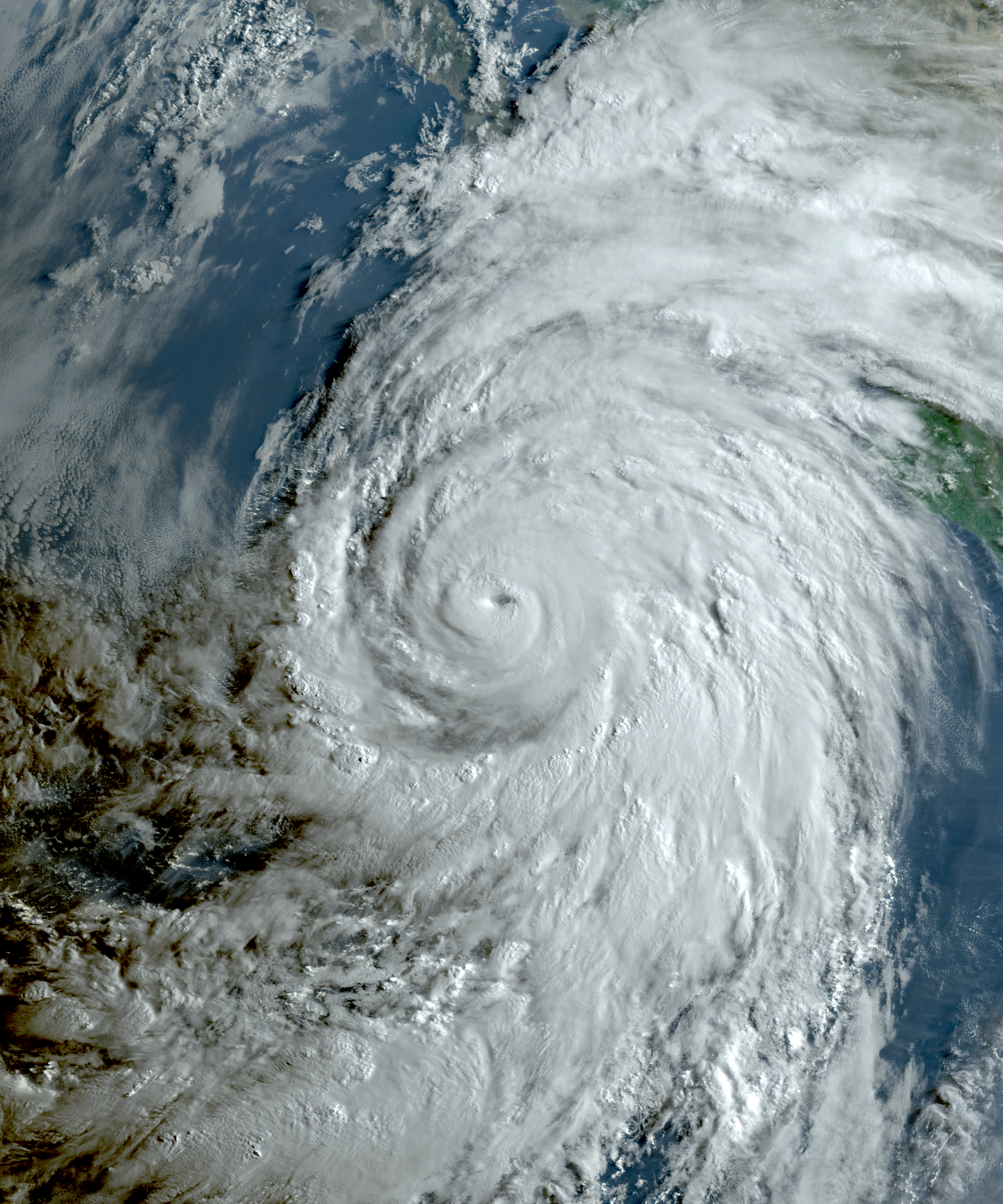
Hurricane Hilary (2023)

Impacts from tropical cyclones in the Pacific Northwest are rare. Most recently, the remnants of Hilary moved through the region in 2023, spurring moderate to heavy rainfall across Idaho.

Wettest tropical cyclones and their remnants in Idaho Highest-known totals
Precipitation			Storm	Location	Ref.
Rank	mm	in	Storm	Location	Ref.
1	76	2.992	Hilary 2023	Dollarhide Summit	
2	52.1	2.051	Kathleen 1976	Ketchum RS	
3	50.5	1.988	Olivia 1982	Powell	

== Illinois ==
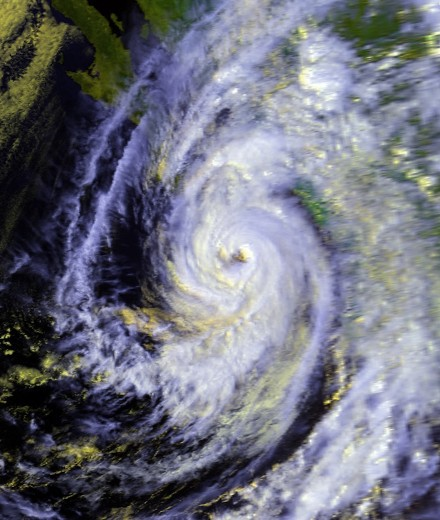
Hurricane Paine (1986)

Hurricane Audrey directed moisture up to a front to its north across the Midwest during late June 1957 as it transitioned into an extratropical cyclone. Heavy rains fell across central Illinois, leading to the wettest known event to be associated with a tropical cyclone or its remnants across Illinois. More recently, the remnants of Hurricane Ike brought heavy flooding to the Chicago area in September 2008.

Wettest tropical cyclones and their remnants in Illinois Highest-known totals
Precipitation			Storm	Location	Ref.
Rank	mm	in	Storm	Location	Ref.
1	259.1	10.20	Audrey 1957	Paris	
2	209.6	8.25	Ike 2008	Elburn	
3	207.8	8.18	Carla 1961	Mount Carroll	
4	108.5	7.64	Claudette 1979	Hutsonville Power Station	
5	192.5	7.58	Paine 1986	Avon 5 NE	
6	178.6	7.03	Tico 1983	New Athens	
7	156.5	6.16	Hermine 2010	Grand Chain	
8	152.7	6.01	Alberto 2018	Glencoe 0.1 NW	
9	151.4	5.96	Lester 1992	Mattoon	
10	146.1	5.75	Chantal 1989	Fulton Dam 13	

== Indiana ==
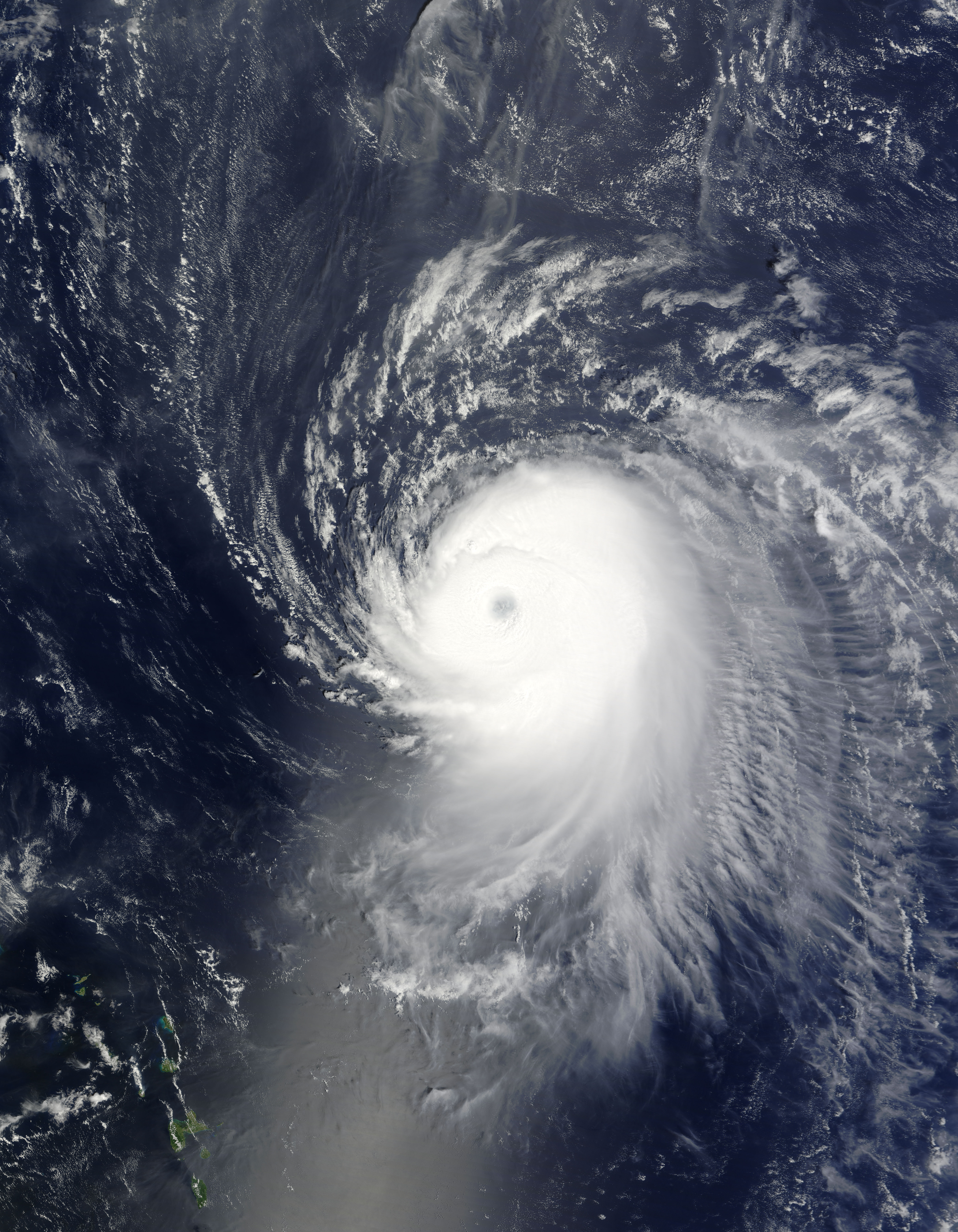
Hurricane Ike

Indiana experienced its wettest tropical cyclone in 2008 with the arrival of Hurricane Ike. In 1979, Hurricane Bob produced considerable flooding in the state.

Wettest tropical cyclones and their remnants in Indiana Highest-known totals
Precipitation			Storm	Location	Ref.
Rank	mm	in	Storm	Location	Ref.
1	236.2	9.30	Ike 2008	South Bend 2.7 ESE	
2	225.3	8.87	Audrey 1957	Rockville	
3	209.8	8.26	Tico 1983	Seymour 2 N	
4	174.2	6.86	Isidore 2002	Lexington 3 N	
5	170.7	6.72	Bill 2015	Grissom AFB	
6	162.6	6.40	Cindy 2017	Albany	
7	162.6	6.40	Erin 1995	North Vernon 1 NW	
8	153.7	6.05	Beryl 2024	Rensselaer 6.2 SE	
9	146.6	5.77	Claudette 1979	Jasper	
10	145.3	5.72	Bob 1979	Edwardsport Power Plant	

== Iowa ==
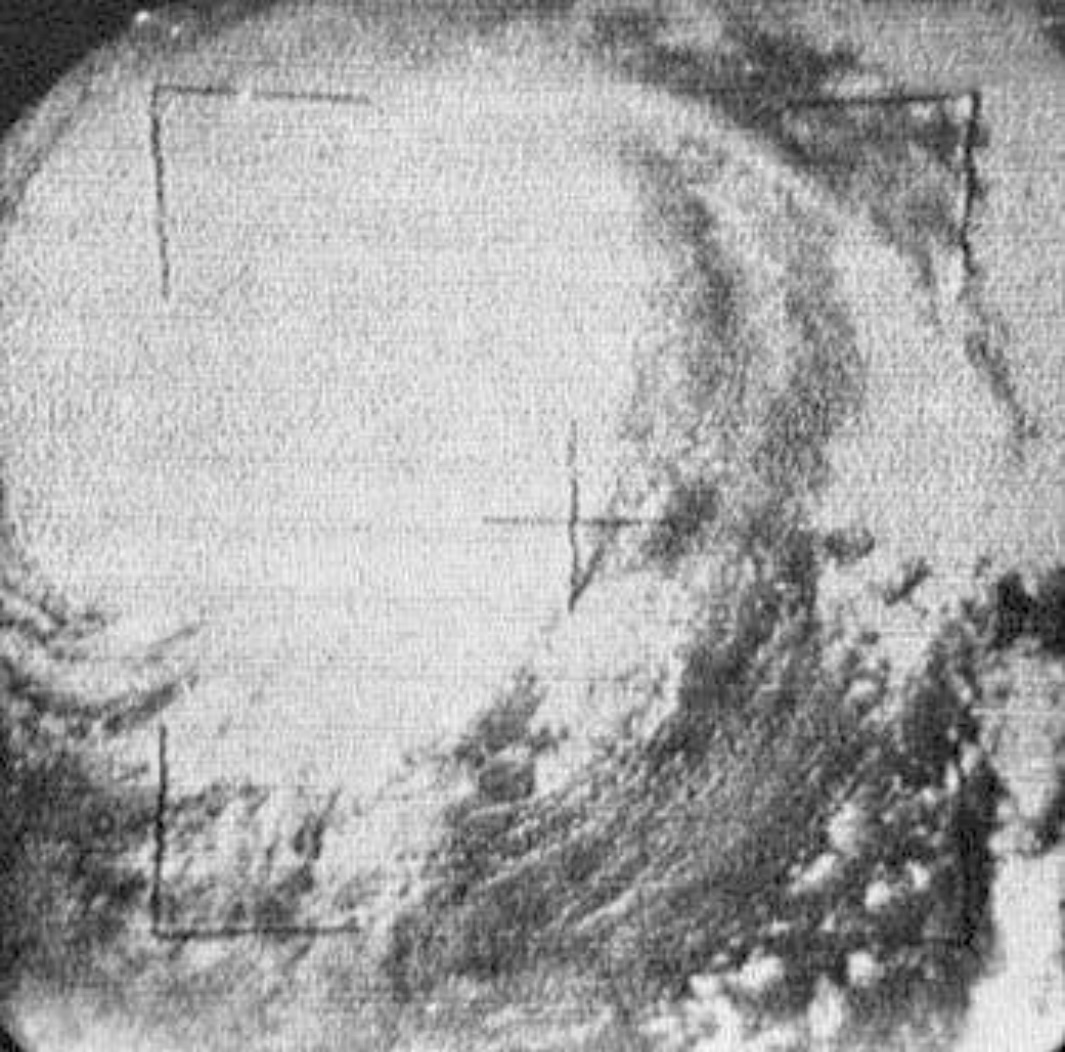
Hurricane Carla

Hurricane Carla was a large hurricane that moved into Texas during September 1961. As it transitioned into an extratropical cyclone across the Great Plains and Midwest, heavy rain fell in a band on the poleward side of a frontal boundary extending northeast from Carla, leading to the wettest known event to be associated with a tropical cyclone or its remains across Iowa.

Wettest tropical cyclones and their remnants in Iowa Highest-known totals
Precipitation			Storm	Location	Ref.
Rank	mm	in	Storm	Location	Ref.
1	229.4	9.03	Carla 1961	Chariton 1 E	
2	124.5	4.90	Frances 1998	Fort Madison	
3	120.9	4.76	Paine 1986	Keokuk Lock Dam 19	
4	99.8	3.93	Waldo 1985	Keosauqua	
5	94.0	3.70	Newton 1986	Mount Pleasant 1 SSW	
6	86.4	3.40	Chantal 1989	De Witt	
7	84.3	3.32	Lester 1992	Sigourney	
8	82.3	3.24	Gustav 2008	Rathbun Dam 2 N	
9	79.0	3.11	Tico 1983	Centerville	
10	60.7	2.39	Juan 1985	Bellevue Lock and Dam 12	

== Kansas ==
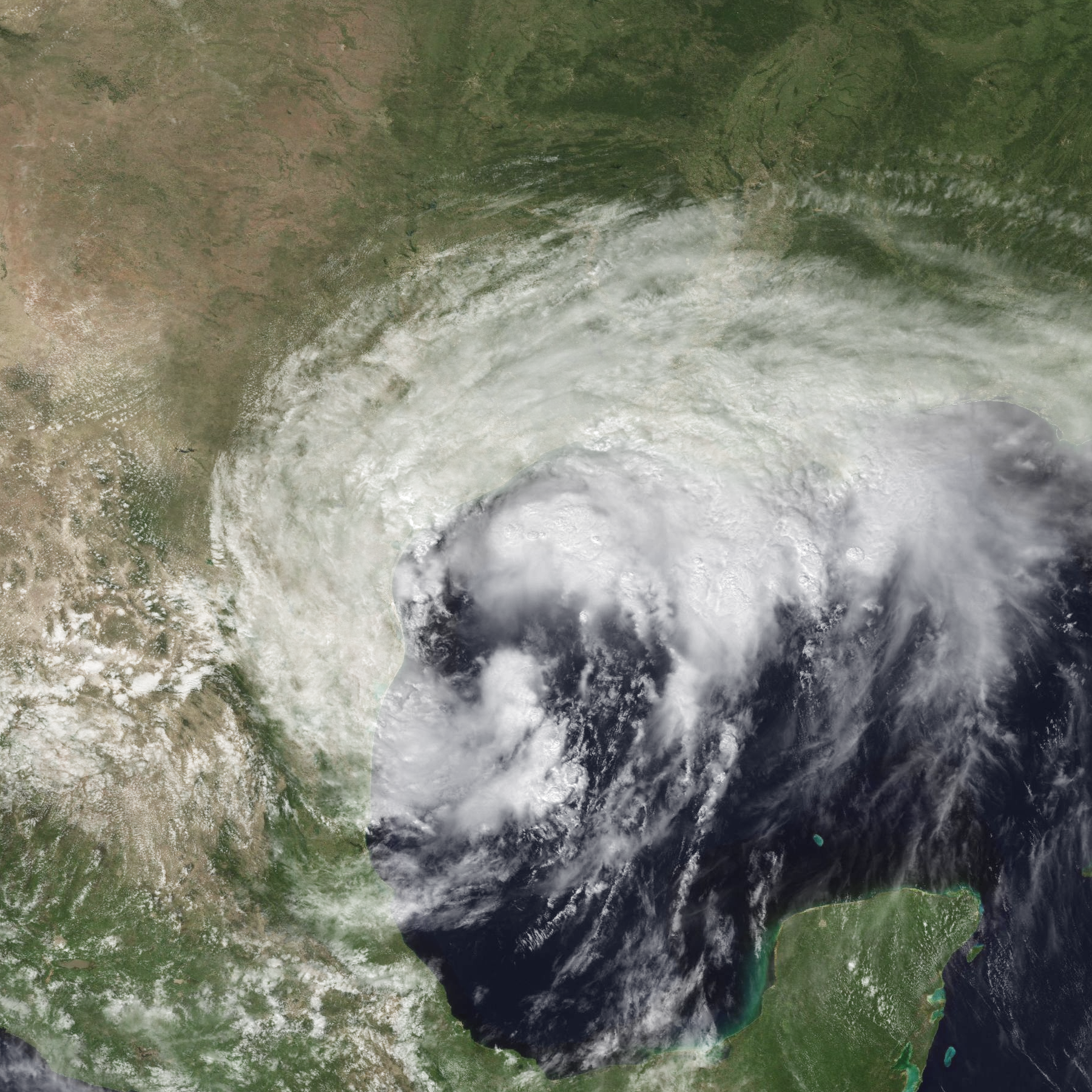
Tropical Storm Frances (1998)

Heavy rainfall from Tropical Storm Frances fell from the western Gulf Coast northward into the Great Plains. Spreading across portions of Kansas, precipitation included with localized amounts above 12 inches (300 mm).

Wettest tropical cyclones and their remnants in Kansas Highest-known totals
Precipitation			Storm	Location	Ref.
Rank	mm	in	Storm	Location	Ref.
1	317.5	12.50	Frances 1998	Fort Scott	
2	288.3	11.35	Paine 1986	Fort Scott	
3	216.4	8.52	Carla 1961	Haddam	
4	170.4	6.71	Tico 1983	Independence	
5	147.1	5.79	Newton 1986	Tonganoxie 5 SE	
6	138.4	5.45	Waldo 1985	Burns	
7	127.0	5.00	Gilbert 1988	Cedar Vale	
8	117.6	4.63	Norma 1981	Iola 1 W	
9	114.6	4.51	Matthew 2004	Hale	
10	104.4	4.11	Gustav 2008	Pittsburg	

== Kentucky ==
Hurricane Dennis (2005)

Soon after moving inland, the 1960 Texas tropical storm looped over South Texas, leading to heavy rains along the coastal plain near Port Lavaca. As it moved north-northeast, bursts of heavy rainfall were accompanied with the system over Arkansas and Kentucky. The maximum in Kentucky not only represents their highest tropical cyclone-related rainfall amount on record, but also the state's all-time 24 hour precipitation record (through 1998).

Wettest tropical cyclones and their remnants in Kentucky Highest-known totals
Precipitation			Storm	Location	Ref.
Rank	mm	in	Storm	Location	Ref.
1	285.8	11.25	Unnamed 1960	Dunmor	
2	242.1	9.53	Dennis 2005		
3	224.0	8.82	Harvey 2017	Brownsville Green River	
4	207.5	8.17	Isidore 2002	Paradise Steam Plant	
5	205.2	8.08	Elena 1985	WPSD-TV Paducah	
6	201.7	7.94	Katrina 2005	Finney	
7	195.8	7.71	Tico 1983	Lloyd Greenup Dam	
8	193.0	7.60	Frederic 1979	Aberdeen	
9	172.5	6.79	Chris 1982	Franklin 1 E	
10	170.4	6.71	Jerry 1989	Gray Hawk	

== Louisiana ==
Allison (2001)

Heavy rains and flooding are the primary problem associated with tropical cyclones across the Pelican State. Recent examples of flooding across the state from tropical cyclones include Tropical Storm Arthur in 2026, Tropical Storm Allison in 2001, Tropical Storm Frances in 1998, Tropical Storm Allison in 1989, and Tropical Storm Claudette in 1979. Three of the four systems stalled across eastern Texas, prolonging the rainfall which occurred over Louisiana. If it were not for the intermittent invasions from tropical cyclones, rainfall during the months of August, September, and October would average about 25% less than it currently does.

Wettest tropical cyclones and their remnants in Louisiana Highest-known totals
Precipitation			Storm	Location	Ref.
Rank	mm	in	Storm	Location	Ref.
1	954.5	37.58	Arthur 2026	Cottonport	
2	952.2	37.50	Unnamed 1940	Miller Island	
3	760.0	29.92	Allison 2001	Thibodaux	
4	652.0	25.67	Allison 1989	Winnfield	
5	595.1	23.43	Barry 2019	Ragley	
6	568.7	22.39	Frances 1998	Terrytown	
7	565.4	22.25	Harvey 2017	Bayou Conway	
8	541.0	21.30	Unnamed 1933	Logansport	
9	533.4	21.00	Gustav 2008	Larto Lake	
10	524.8	20.66	Isaac 2012	New Orleans Carrollton	

== Maine ==
Hurricane Irene

The combined impact from a Nor'easter just one day before Daisy hit, and Hurricane Daisy, caused severe flooding in Maine, when rain fell for 65 consecutive hours in some locations. Rainfall from the two systems caused record rainfall in some areas in Maine. Flooding caused by Hurricane Irene's heavy rainfall washed out two bridges on State Route 27 in Carrabassett Valley.

Wettest tropical cyclones and their remnants in Maine Highest-known totals
Precipitation			Storm	Location	Ref.
Rank	mm	in	Storm	Location	Ref.
1	251.7	9.91	Irene 2011	St. Baxter Park	
2	240.5	9.47	Daisy 1962	Portland Int'l Jetport	
3	221.5	8.72	Floyd 1999	Poland	
4	209.8	8.26	Donna 1960	Sanford 2 NNW	
5	209.3	8.24	Bob 1991	Portland Int'l Jetport	
6	193.9	7.61	Hanna 2008	Bar Harbour	
7	165.1	6.50	Lee 2023	Steuben 1 SW	
8	164.6	6.48	Arthur 2014	Whiting 3 NNE	
9	148.6	5.85	Belle 1976	Brunswick	
10	141.2	5.56	Gerda 1969	Saco	

== Maryland ==
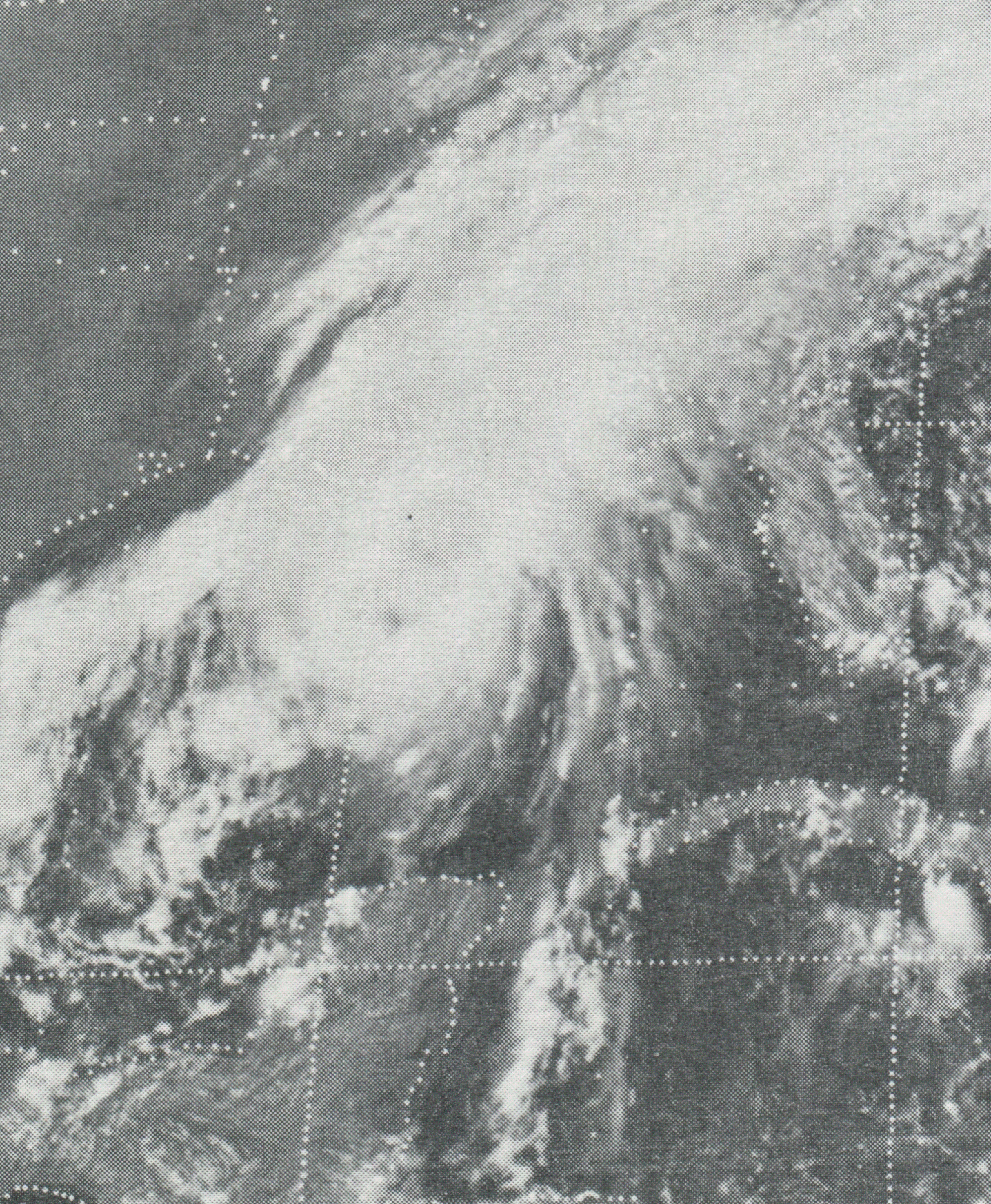
Hurricane Eloise

Eloise's remnants brought great moisture to the Northeast third of the United States in the combination of warm, tropical air and cold air from a cold front. From Virginia through New Jersey, 5 inches (130 mm) of rain were reported, while New York and Pennsylvania experienced 10 inches (250 mm). Westminster, Maryland received the maximum amount from the storm in this region with a total of 14.23 inches (361 mm). The 1935 Labor Day hurricane holds the record for producing the most rainfall in Maryland.

Wettest tropical cyclones and their remnants in Maryland Highest-known totals
Precipitation			Storm	Location	Ref.
Rank	mm	in	Storm	Location	Ref.
1	424.2	16.70	Labor Day 1935 hurricane	Easton	
2	361.4	14.23	Eloise 1975	Westminster 2 SSE	
3	346.2	13.63	Lee 2011	Waldorf 3.6 SSE	
4	344.4	13.56	Agnes 1972	Westminster 2 SSE	
5	337.8	13.30	First August 1928 hurricane	Cheltenham	
6	329.2	12.96	Irene 2011	Plum Point	
7	318.8	12.83	Sandy 2012	Belleview	
8	319.8	12.59	Floyd 1999	Chestertown	
9	312.9	12.32	Connie 1955	Preston 1 S	
10	238.8	9.40	David 1979	Catoctin Mountain Park	

== Massachusetts ==
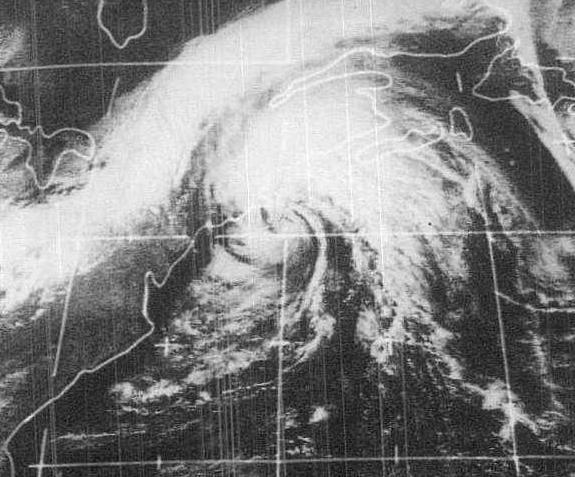
Tropical Storm Carrie (1972)

The wettest known tropical cyclone to impact New England is also the wettest known for the state of Massachusetts. The flood from Hurricane Diane led to a significant death toll (nearly 200) from Pennsylvania eastward through southern New England.

Wettest tropical cyclones and their remnants in Massachusetts Highest-known totals
Precipitation			Storm	Location	Ref.
Rank	mm	in	Storm	Location	Ref.
1	501.7	19.75	Diane 1955	Westfield	
2	324.4	12.77	New England Hurricane of 1938	Gardner	
3	317.5	12.50	Carrie 1972	Tashmoo	
4	312.4	12.3	1933 Outer Banks hurricane	Provincetown	
5	251.0	9.88	Eloise 1975	Westfield	
6	241.3	9.50	Ida 2021	New Bedford	
7	236.7	9.32	Connie 1955	Plainfield	
8	231.65	9.12	Esther 1961	Ashland	
9	231.1	9.10	Irene 2011	Savoy	
10	214.1	8.43	Jeanne 2004	Nantucket	

== Michigan ==
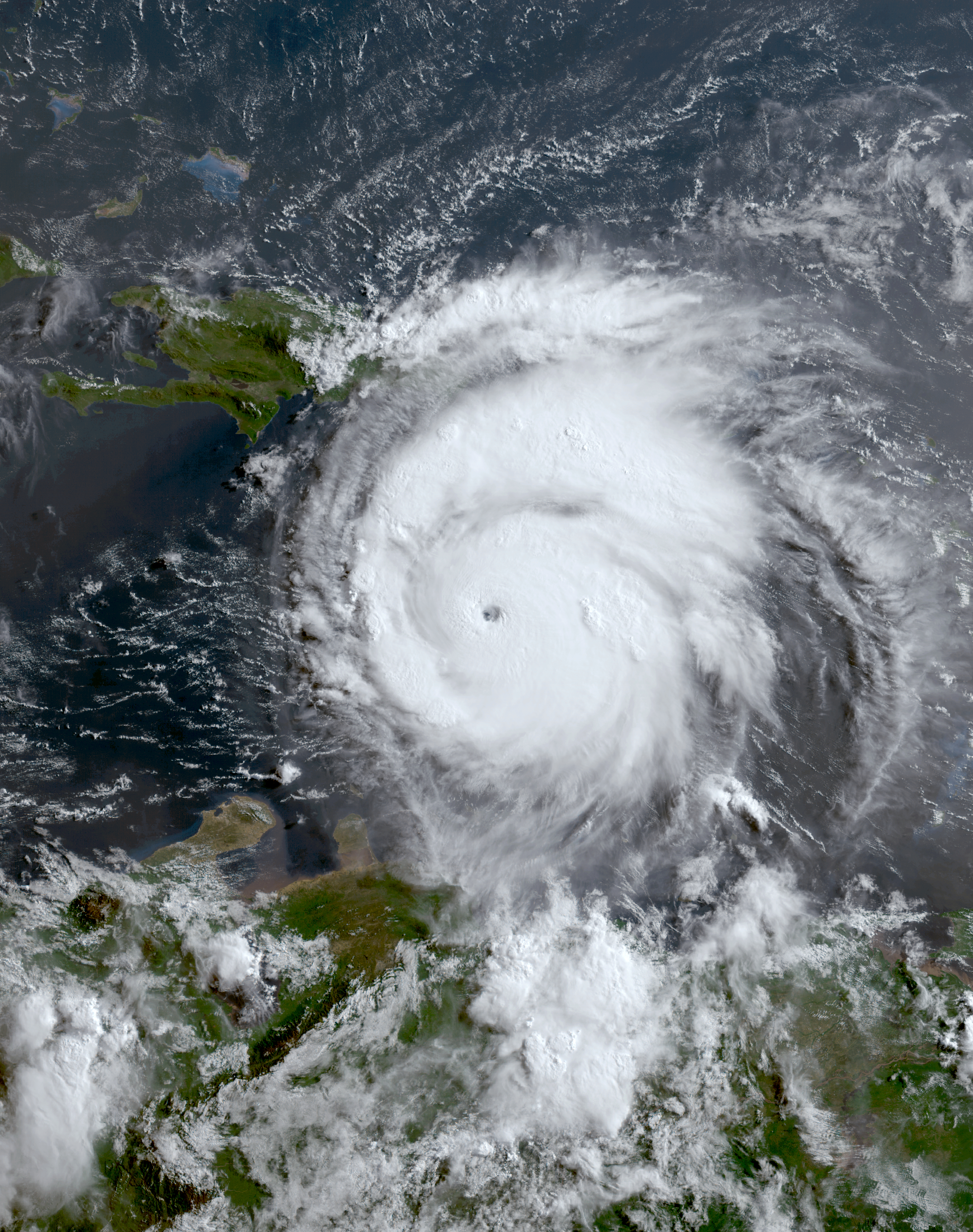
Hurricane Beryl (2024)

Hurricane Beryl in 2024 produced more rainfall in Michigan than any other tropical cyclone, surpassing Carla in 1961.

Wettest tropical cyclones and their remnants in Michigan Highest-known totals
Precipitation			Storm	Location	Ref.
Rank	mm	in	Storm	Location	Ref.
1	171.2	6.74	Beryl 2024	Burton	
2	154.2	6.07	Carla 1961	Boyne Falls	
3	136.4	5.37	Chantal 1989	Kent City 2 SW	
4	127.5	5.02	Newton 1986	South Haven	
5	115.8	4.56	Juan 1985	Escanaba	
6	105.2	4.14	Opal 1995	Grosse Pointe Farms	
7	103.4	4.07	Fran 1996	Port Huron	
8	101.1	3.98	Gustav 2008	Sparta 2 SW	
9	90.7	3.57	Alberto 2018	Luzerne 2.4 NE	
10	85.9	3.38	Frances 1998	Kenton	

== Minnesota ==
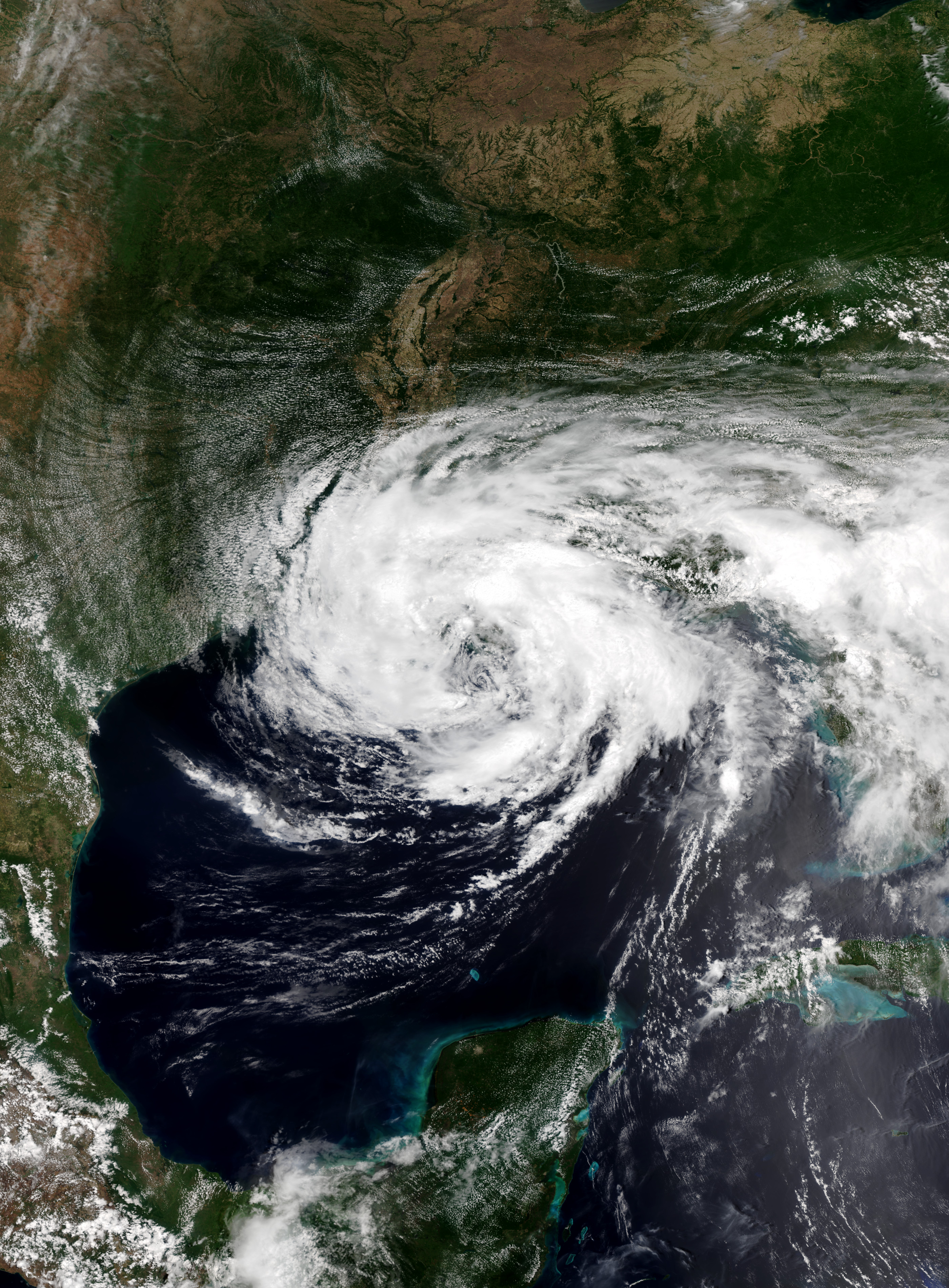
Tropical Storm Cristobal (2020)

Few tropical cyclone remnants originating from the eastern Pacific or Atlantic Basins make it as far north as Minnesota. Most recently, 2020's Tropical Storm Cristobal dropped heavy rainfall exceeding 5 inches (130 mm) in localized spots.

Wettest tropical cyclones and their remnants in Minnesota Highest-known totals
Precipitation			Storm	Location	Ref.
Rank	mm	in	Storm	Location	Ref.
1	128.5	5.06	Cristobal 2020	Whalan 1 NE	
2	97.3	3.83	Lester 1992	Indus 3 W	
3	52.8	2.08	Javier 2004	Bemidji Municipal AP	
4	41.9	1.65	Alicia 1983	Montgomery	
5	38.1	1.50	Newton 1986	Beaver	

== Mississippi ==
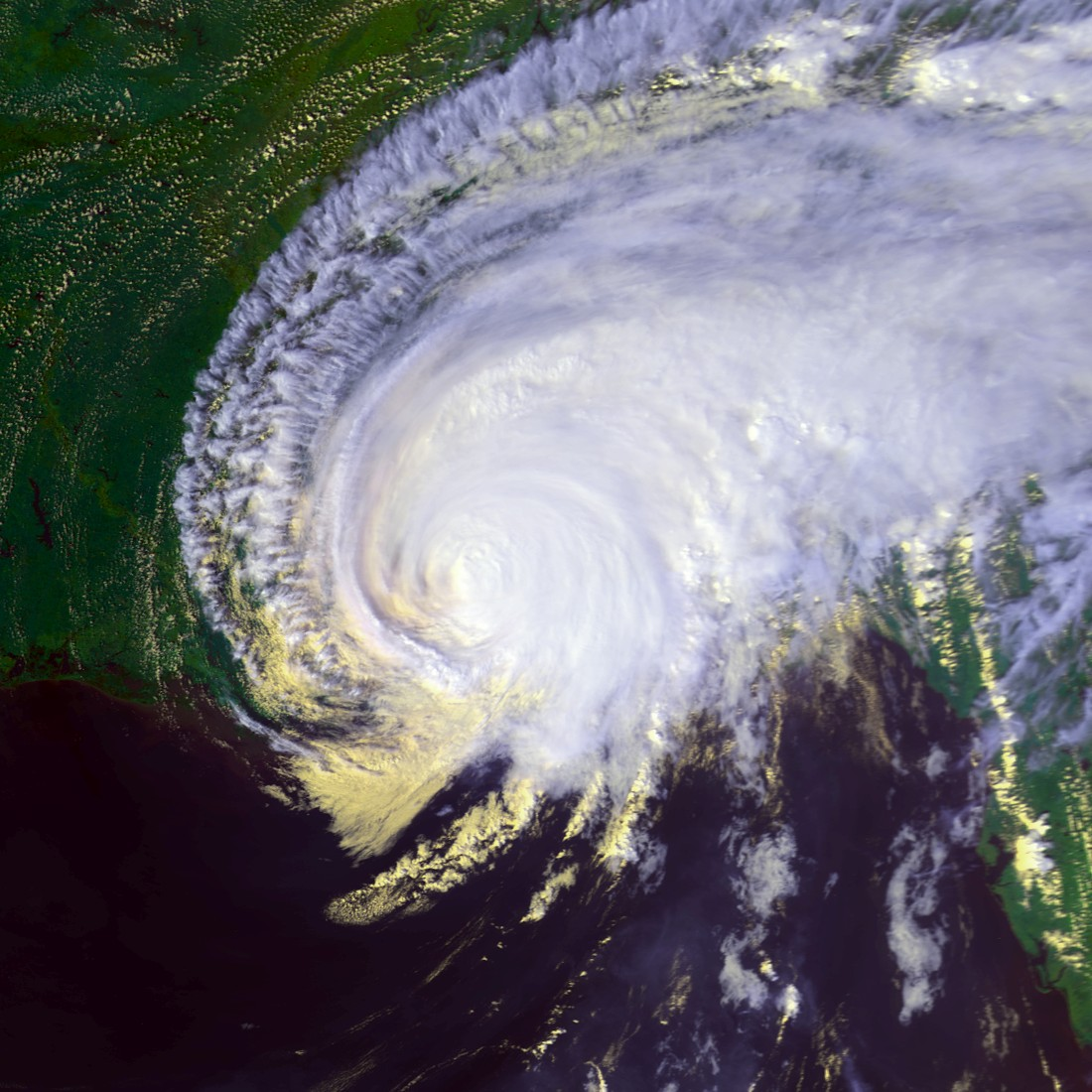
Hurricane Georges (1998)

Hurricane Georges stalled over the southern portion of the state, it produced torrential rainfall, exceeding 30 inches (760 mm) locally. The heavy rainfall contributed to significant river overflowing, including the Tchoutacabouffa River at D'Iberville, which set a record crest of 19 feet (5.8 m).

Wettest tropical cyclones and their remnants in Mississippi Highest-known totals
Precipitation			Storm	Location	Ref.
Rank	mm	in	Storm	Location	Ref.
1	818.1	32.21	Georges 1998	Wiggins 5 W	
2	678.4	26.71	Isaac 2012	Pascagoula	
3	535.0	21.06	Unnamed 1987		
4	481.3	18.95	Allison 2001	Liberty 5 W	
5	388.1	15.28	Claudette 2021	Gulfport 6 WNW	
6	364.0	14.33	Gustav 2008	Chatham	
7	346.7	13.65	Cristobal 2020	Caesar	
8	344.2	13.55	Lee 2011	Waveland	
9	333.5	13.13	Isidore 2002	Poplarville Experimental Stn 5 W	
10	333.2	13.12	Ida 2021	Bay St. Louis 1.4 WSW	

== Missouri ==
Remnants of Tropical Storm Erin over Oklahoma on August 19, 2007

Remnant tropical cyclones can move into the state which originate in either the Pacific or Atlantic hurricane basins. Tropical Storm Erin reintensified over Oklahoma leading to heavy rainfall in that state. As the system moved eastward, its surface low quickly dissipated. However, its mid-level circulation remained robust, leading to a burst of heavy rainfall across Missouri exceeding 10 inches (250 mm) in isolated spots, which became the wettest tropical cyclone remnant on record for the state.

Wettest tropical cyclones and their remnants in Missouri Highest-known totals
Precipitation			Storm	Location	Ref.
Rank	mm	in	Storm	Location	Ref.
1	302.8	11.94	Erin 2007	Miller	
2	291.6	11.48	Bertha 1957	Kennett	
3	258.1	10.16	Audrey 1957	Hermann	
4	249.4	9.82	Paine 1986	Truman Dam & Reservoir	
5	237.2	9.34	Carla 1961	Concordia	
6	231.1	9.10	Frances 1998	Odessa 4 SE	
7	230.1	9.06	Gustav 2008	Alley Spring/Jack Fork	
8	209.6	8.25	Bill 2015	Fordland 4 WNW	
9	186.7	7.35	Tico 1983	Appleton City	
10	168.4	6.63	Waldo 1985	Polo	

== Montana ==
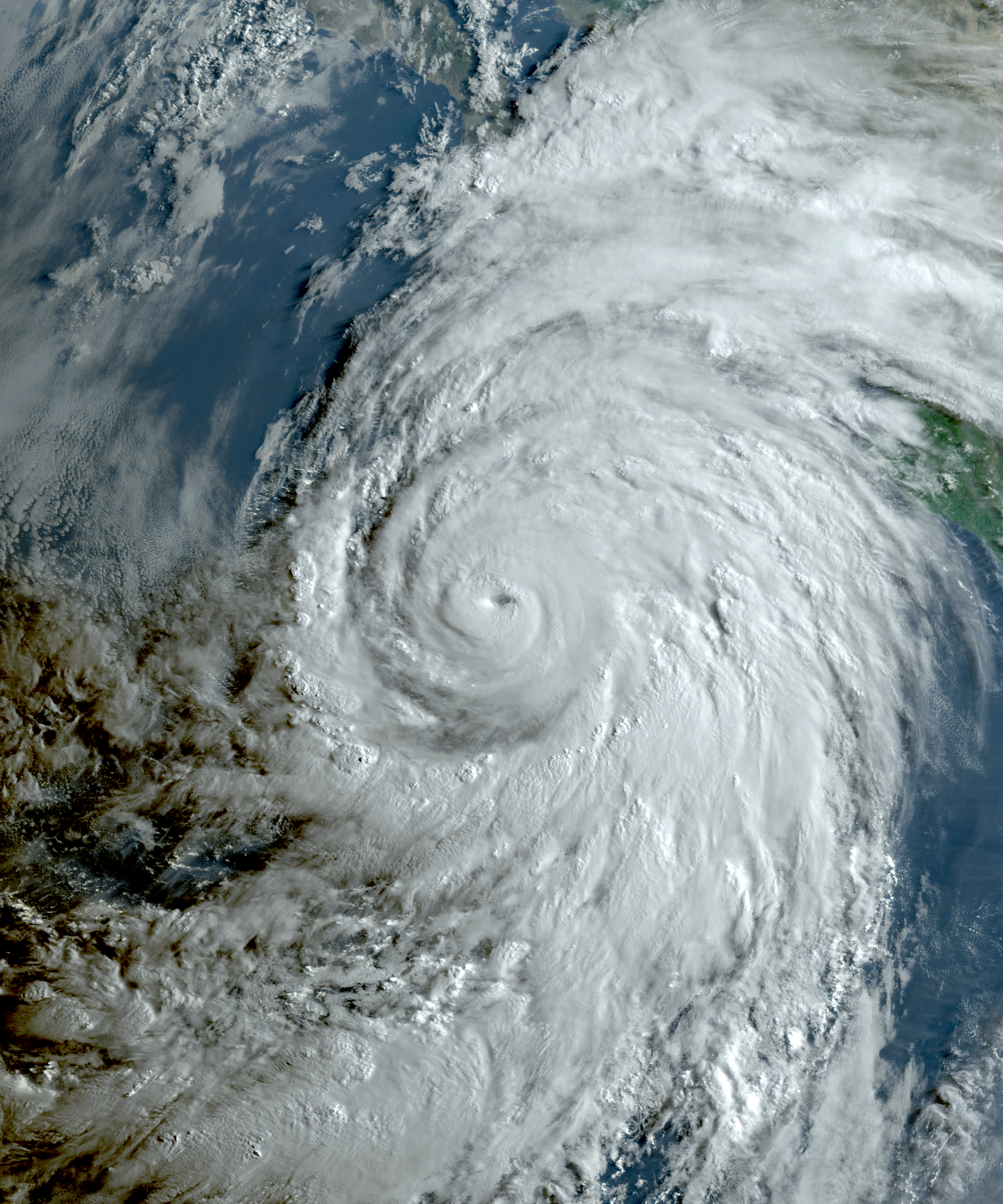
Hurricane Hilary (2023)

It is rare for tropical cyclone remnants originating from the eastern Pacific or Atlantic Basins to make it as far north as Montana. The remnants of Hilary did so most recently, in 2023.

Wettest tropical cyclones and their remnants in Montana Highest-known totals
Precipitation			Storm	Location	Ref.
Rank	mm	in	Storm	Location	Ref.
1	58.0	2.30	Hilary 2023	Albro Lake, Carrot Basin	
2	48.0	1.89	Kathleen 1976	Lakeview	

== Nebraska ==
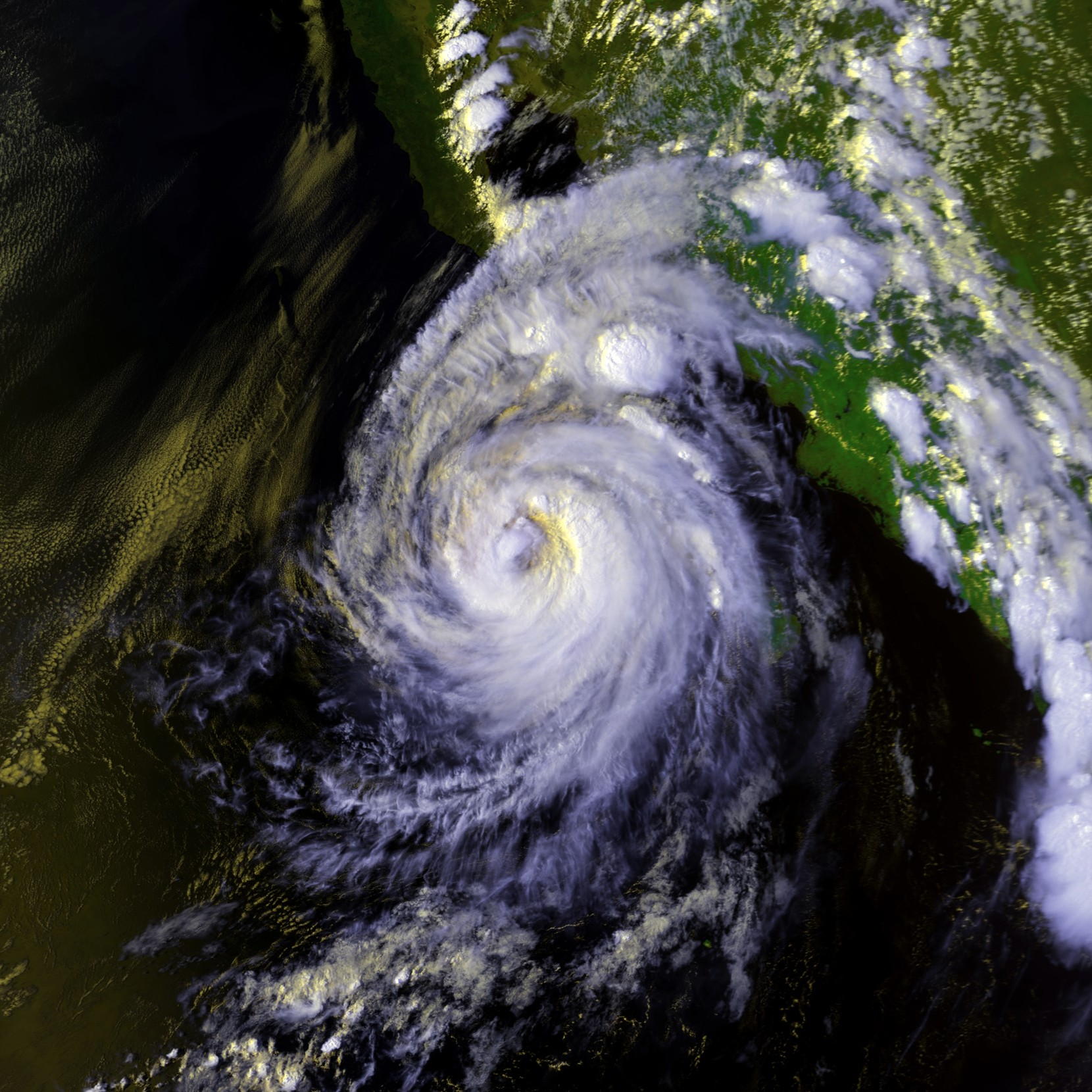
Hurricane Lester (1992)

The wettest known event in Nebraska to be associated with a tropical cyclone or its remains was Hurricane Carla. Carla resulted in the heaviest known rainfall in several other states as well.

Wettest tropical cyclones and their remnants in Nebraska Highest-known totals
Precipitation			Storm	Location	Ref.
Rank	mm	in	Storm	Location	Ref.
1	144.3	5.68	Carla 1961	Hubbrell	
2	132.1	5.20	Lester 1992	Arnold	
3	69.3	2.73	Alicia 1983	Miller	
4	49.0	1.93	Tico 1983	Beemer	
5	46.7	1.84	Javier 2004	Ainsworth Municipal AP	
6	44.5	1.75	Waldo 1985	Falls City Brenner AP	
7	23.6	0.93	Newton 1986	Lyman	

== Nevada ==
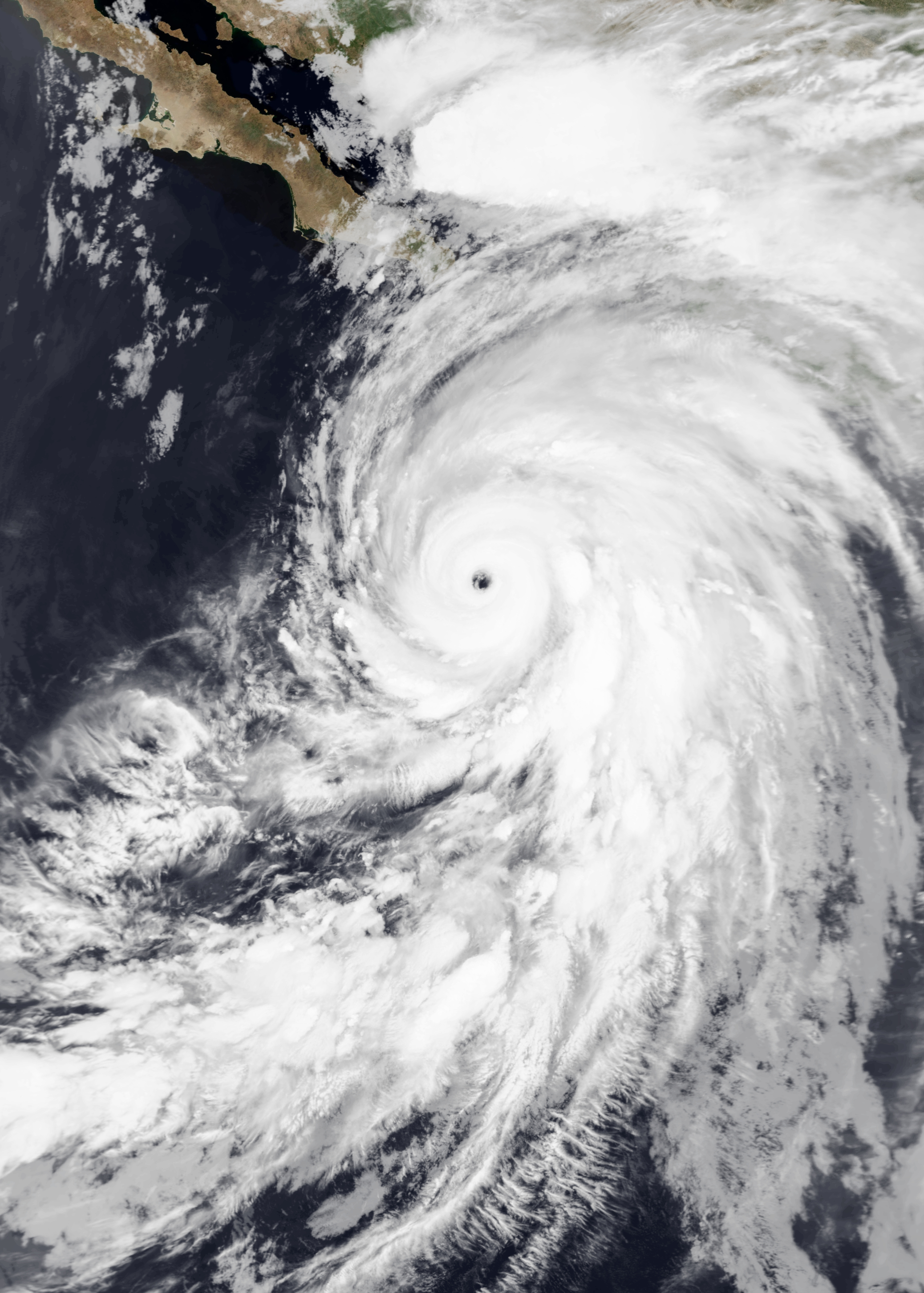
Hilary (2023)

Every few years, Nevada is impacted by an eastern Pacific tropical cyclone, or its remnants. The wettest recorded tropical cyclone rain-event was when the remnants of Hilary traversed the state. The new mark it set is more than double the previous record.

Wettest tropical cyclones and their remnants in Nevada Highest-known totals
Precipitation			Storm	Location	Ref.
Rank	mm	in	Storm	Location	Ref.
1	234	9.213	Hilary 2023	Lee Canyon	
2	111	4.36	Unnamed 1906		
3	105	4.14	Doreen 1977	Adaven	
4	89.7	3.53	Nora 1997	Mt. Charleston/Kyle Canyon	
5	89.4	3.52	Olivia 1982	Ely Yelland Field	
6	86.4	3.40	Kathleen 1976	Searchlight	
7	73.7	2.90	Norman 1978	Adaven	
8	50.8	2.00	Boris 1990	Lund	
9	32.8	1.29	Isis 1998	Goldfield	
10	5.33	0.21	Lester 1992	Montello 2 SE	

== New Hampshire ==
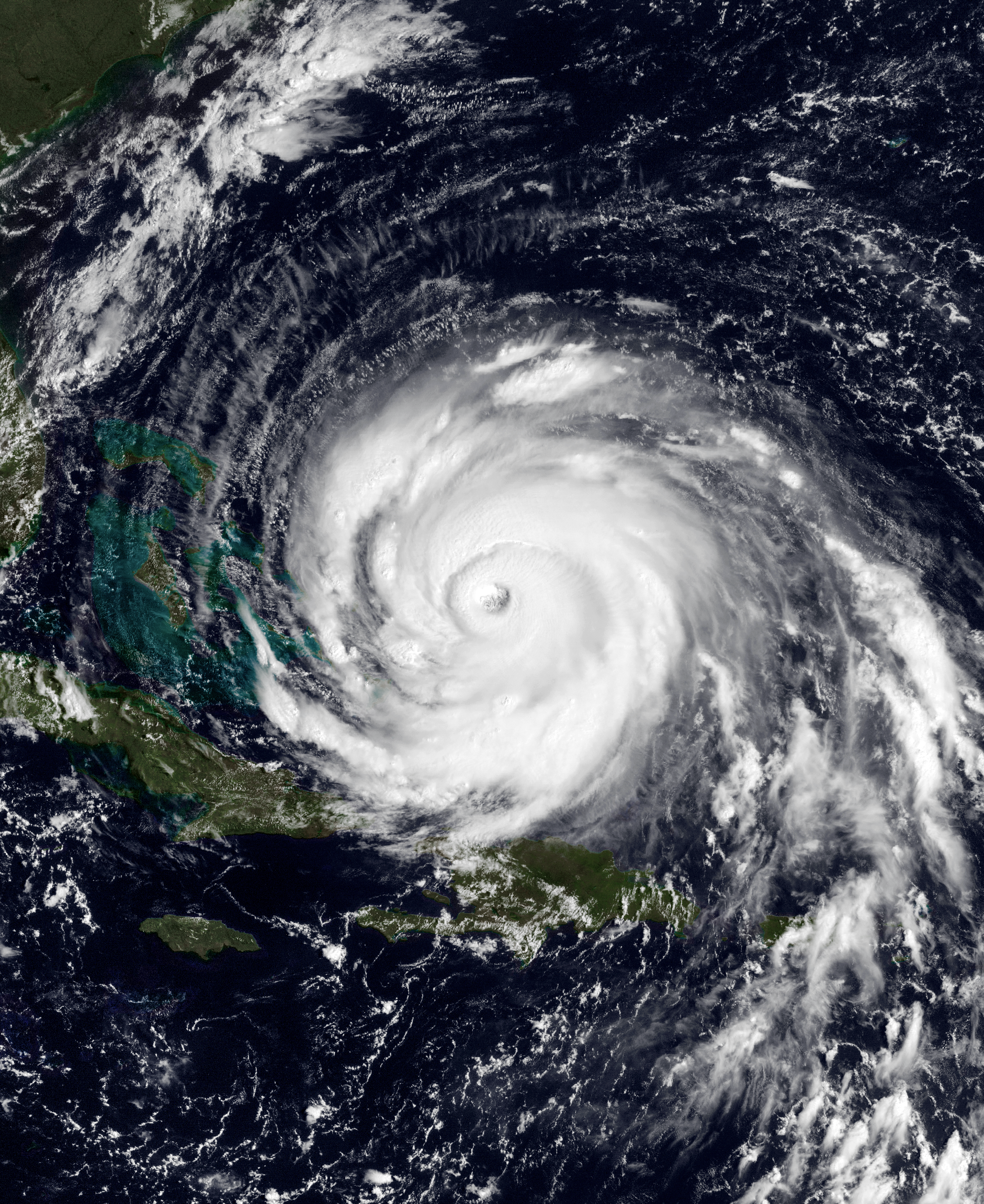
Hurricane Floyd

A large swath of heavy rainfall spread up the East Coast along a frontal zone draping over the northern side of Hurricane Floyd. Nearly 10 inches (250 mm) fell across portions of New Hampshire, the most recorded during the passage of a tropical cyclone or its remnants.

Wettest tropical cyclones and their remnants in New Hampshire Highest-known totals
Precipitation			Storm	Location	Ref.
Rank	mm	in	Storm	Location	Ref.
1	242.3	9.54	Floyd 1999	Mount Washington	
2	189.7	7.47	Bertha 1996	Mount Washington	
3	189.5	7.46	Bob 1991	Mount Washington	
4	186.1	7.33	Irene 2011	Pinkham Notch	
5	184.2	7.25	Donna 1960	Macdowell Dam	
6	182.4	7.18	Connie 1955	Newport	
7	168.7	6.64	Lee 2011	Keene 1.7 WSW	
8	165.9	6.53	Eloise 1975	Greenville 2 NNE	
9	153.7	6.05	Sandy 2012	Randolph 1.4 NE	
10	153.2	6.03	Gloria 1985	Mount Washington	

== New Jersey ==
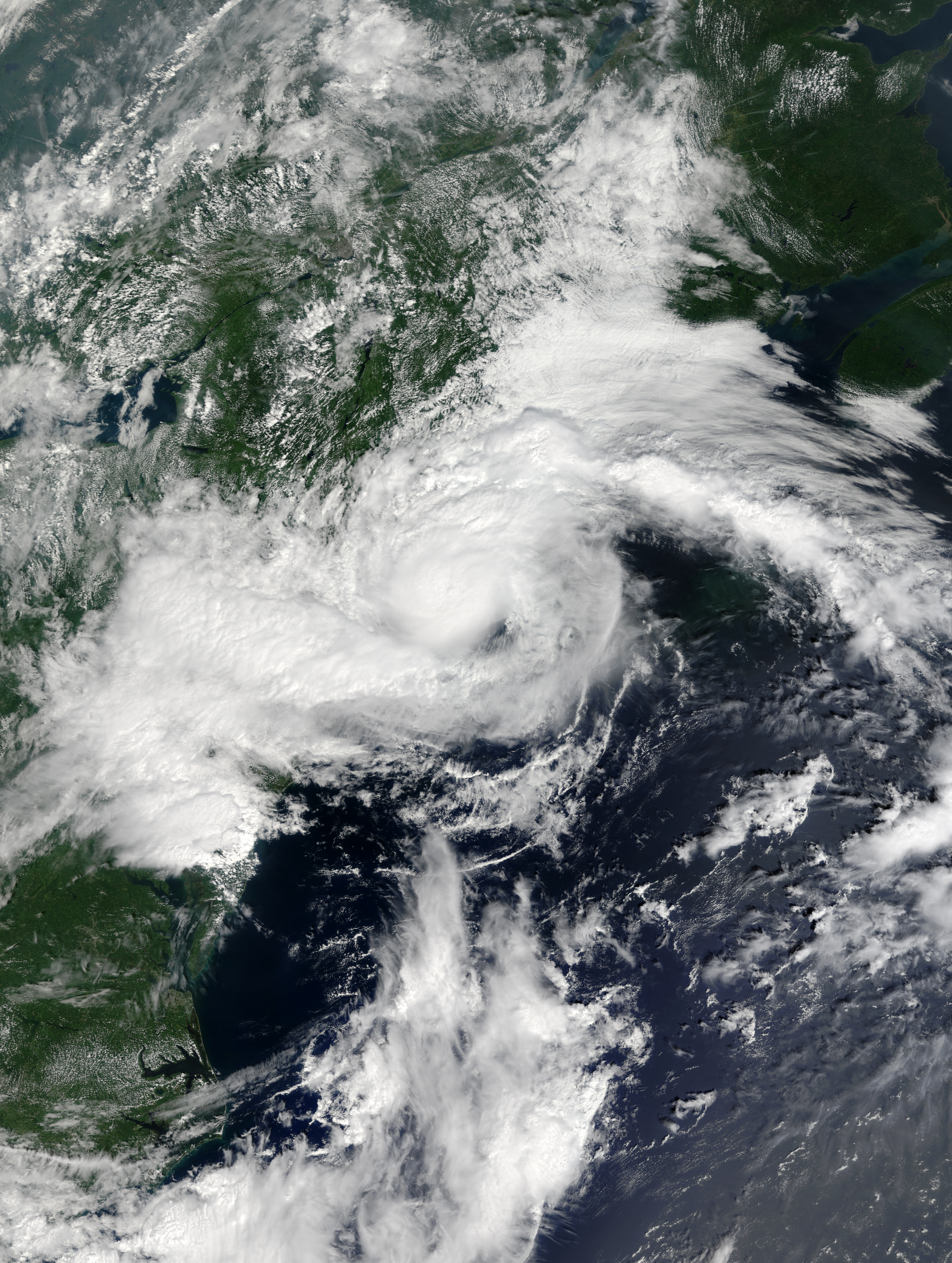
Hurricane Henri offshore the coast of New Jersey, while dropping heavy rain over the state.

A large swath of heavy rainfall spread up the East Coast along a frontal zone draping over the northern side of Hurricane Floyd. Hurricane Four of the September 1940 hurricane season holds the record for the wettest tropical cyclone in New Jersey.

Wettest tropical cyclones and their remnants in New Jersey Highest-known totals
Precipitation			Storm	Location	Ref.
Rank	mm	in	Storm	Location	Ref.
1	609.6	24.00	September 1940 hurricane	Ewan	
2	452.1	17.80	August 19, 1939	Manahawkin, New Jersey	
3	363.2	14.30	Henri 2021	Concordia	
4	358.9	14.13	Floyd 1999	Little Falls	
5	304.3	11.98	1944 Great Atlantic hurricane	New Brunswick Experimental Station	
6	302.5	11.91	Sandy 2012	Wildwood Crest 0.6 NNE	
7	291.6	11.48	Connie 1955	Canistear Reservoir	
8	286.3	11.27	Irene 2011	Freehold Township	
9	267.0	10.51	Eloise 1975	New Brunswick 3 SE	
10	261.4	10.29	Doria 1971		

== New Mexico ==
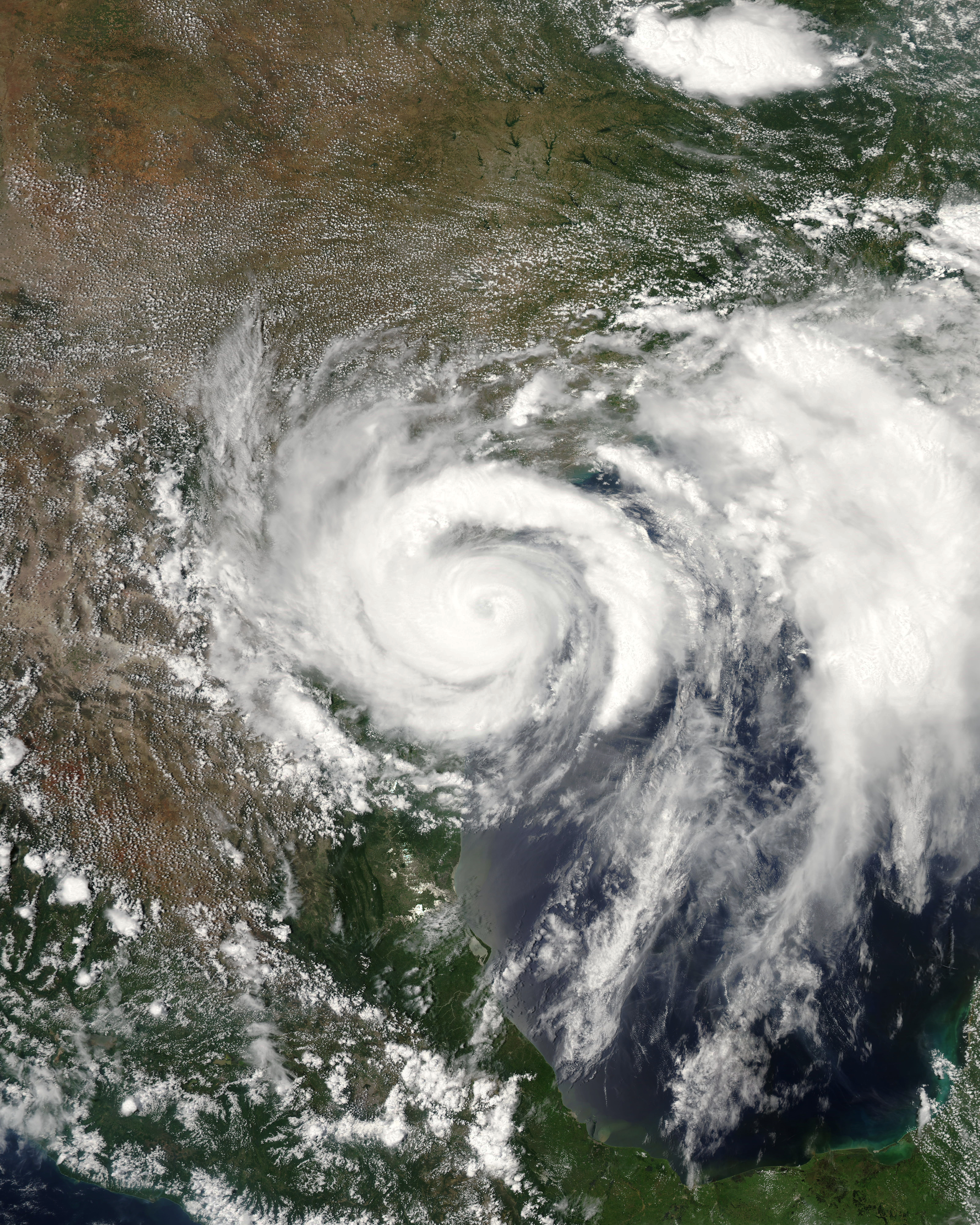
Hurricane Dolly

Tropical cyclones, and their remnants, move into New Mexico from both the eastern Pacific and Atlantic basins. Although Atlantic Basin tropical cyclones are more unusual events, the rainfall record for New Mexico was from a tropical depression which moved across Texas from the Gulf of Mexico in October 1954.

Wettest tropical cyclones and their remnants in New Mexico Highest-known totals
Precipitation			Storm	Location	Ref.
Rank	mm	in	Storm	Location	Ref.
1	248.9	9.80	Tropical Depression (10/1954)	Canton	
2	216.7	8.53	Dolly 2008	Sunspot	
3	169.2	6.66	Waldo 1985	Hobbs	
4	134.9	5.31	Octave 1983	Luna RS	
5	87.12	3.43	Newton 2016	Texico	
6	84.84	3.34	TD Sixteen-E 2015	Mogollon	
7	80.52	3.17	Heather 1977	Yeso 2 S	
8	75.95	2.99	Raymond 1989	Red River	
9	62.99	2.48	Javier 2004	Albuquerque	
10	55.12	2.17	Lester 1992	Lindrith 1 WSW	

== New York ==
Hurricane Irene near New York

Tropical cyclones moving up the East Coast bring rainfall to New York frequently. During Hurricane Connie, over 13 inches (330 mm) fell in isolated spots, which was the most rainfall recorded with a tropical cyclone or its remains across the state.

Wettest tropical cyclones and their remnants in New York Highest-known totals
Precipitation			Storm	Location	Ref.
Rank	mm	in	Storm	Location	Ref.
1	386.1	15.20	Connie 1955	Slide Mountain	
2	337.8	13.30	Irene 2011	East Durham	
3	331.2	12.25	Floyd 1999	Yorktown Heights 1 W	
4	300.5	11.83	Lee 2011	Appalachian	
5	282.2	11.11	1944 Great Atlantic hurricane	Mineola	
6	280.9	11.06	Eloise 1975	Bedford Hills	
7	250.1	9.85	Henri 2021	Brooklyn	
8	229.9	9.05	Diane 1955	Montauk	
9	226.6	8.92	Ida 2021	Staten Island	
10	222.8	8.77	1933 Chesapeake–Potomac hurricane	Honk Falls	

== North Carolina ==
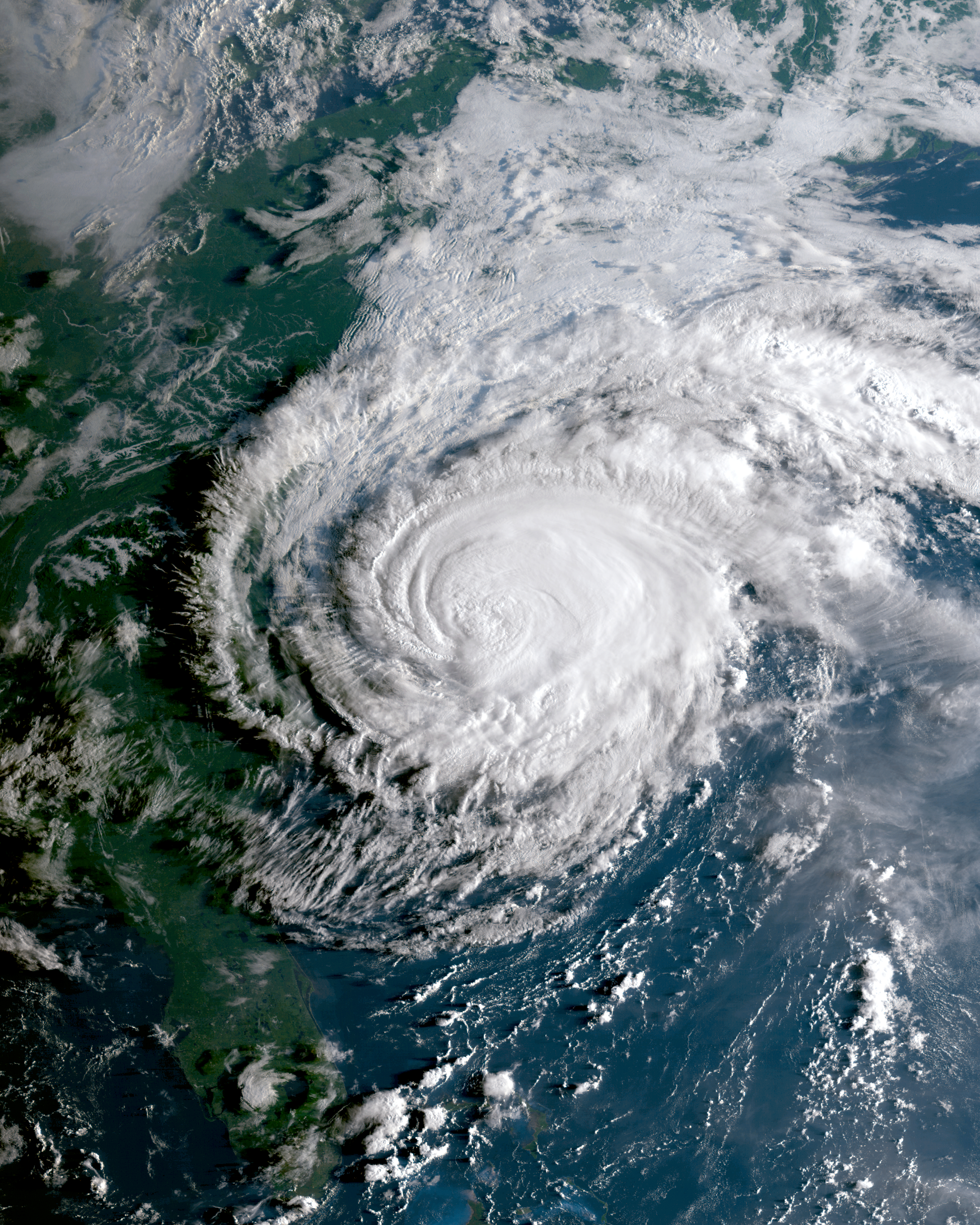
Hurricane Florence

Heavy rains accompany tropical cyclones and their remnants which move northeast from the Gulf of Mexico coastline, as well as inland from the western subtropical Atlantic Ocean. As much as 15% of the rainfall which occurs during the warm season in the Carolinas is attributable to tropical cyclones. Over the past 30 years, the wettest tropical cyclone to strike the coastal plain was Hurricane Florence of September 2018, which dropped over 35 inches (890 mm) of rainfall in Elizabethtown. In the mountains, Hurricane Helene of September 2024 was the wettest, bringing over 30 inches (760 mm) of rainfall to Busick, which is the settlement closest to Mount Mitchell.

Wettest tropical cyclones and their remnants in North Carolina Highest-known totals
Precipitation			Storm	Location	Ref.
Rank	mm	in	Storm	Location	Ref.
1	912.6	35.93	Florence 2018	Elizabethtown	
2	781.8	30.78	Helene 2024	Busick	
3	611.1	24.06	Floyd 1999	Southport 5 N	
4	602.7	23.73	Mid-July Hurricane 1916	Altapass	
5	598.7	23.57	Frances 2004	Mount Mitchell	
6	594.6	23.41	Fred 2021	Lake Toxaway 3N	
7	524.5	20.65	Mid-Aug Hurricane 1940	Idlewild	
8	505.7	19.91	Dennis 1999	Ocracoke	
9	482.1	18.98	Diana 1984	Southport 5 N	
10	481.3	18.95	Matthew 2016	Evergreen	

== North Dakota ==
Hurricane Javier at peak intensity

It is rare for tropical cyclone remnants originating from the eastern Pacific or Atlantic Basins to migrate as far north as North Dakota. The remains of Javier in 2004 dropped locally heavy rainfall exceeding 1 inch (25 mm) in localized spots.

Wettest tropical cyclones and their remnants in North Dakota Highest-known totals
Precipitation			Storm	Location	Ref.
Rank	mm	in	Storm	Location	Ref.
1	34.0	1.34	Javier 2004	Homme Dam	

== Northern Mariana Islands ==
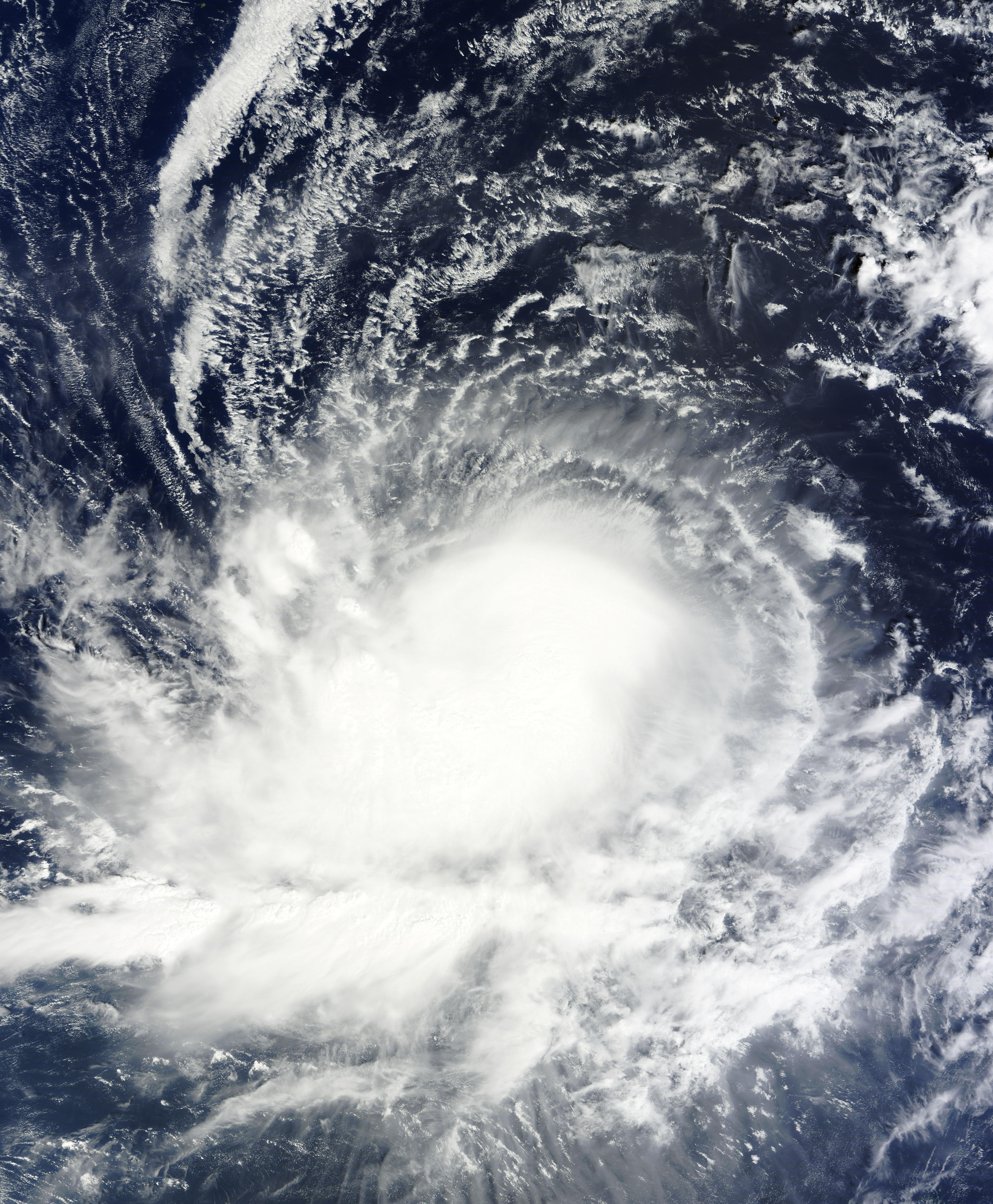
Typhoon Champi (2015)

The Northern Mariana Islands are an archipelago north of Guam which gets impacted by typhoons in the western Pacific from time to time. Typhoon Champi dropped 26.25 inches (667 mm) on Tinian in 2015, making it the wettest known tropical cyclone for the island chain.

Wettest tropical cyclones and their remnants in the Northern Marianas Islands Highest-known totals
Precipitation			Storm	Location	Ref.
Rank	mm	in	Storm	Location	Ref.
1	666.8	26.25	Champi 2015	Tinian	
2	487.6	19.20	Steve 1993	Saipan	
3	241.3	9.50	Seth 1991	Saipan	
4	205.7	8.10	Soulik 2006	Pagan	
5	173.2	6.82	Nabi 2005	Saipan	
6	119.1	4.69	Bavi 2015	Tinian	
7	118.1	4.65	Sanvu 2012	Tinian	
8	90.9	3.58	Kong-rey 2007	Pagan	
9	85.8	3.38	Mirinae 2009	Rota	
10	82.5	3.25	Melor 2009	Tinian	

== Ohio ==
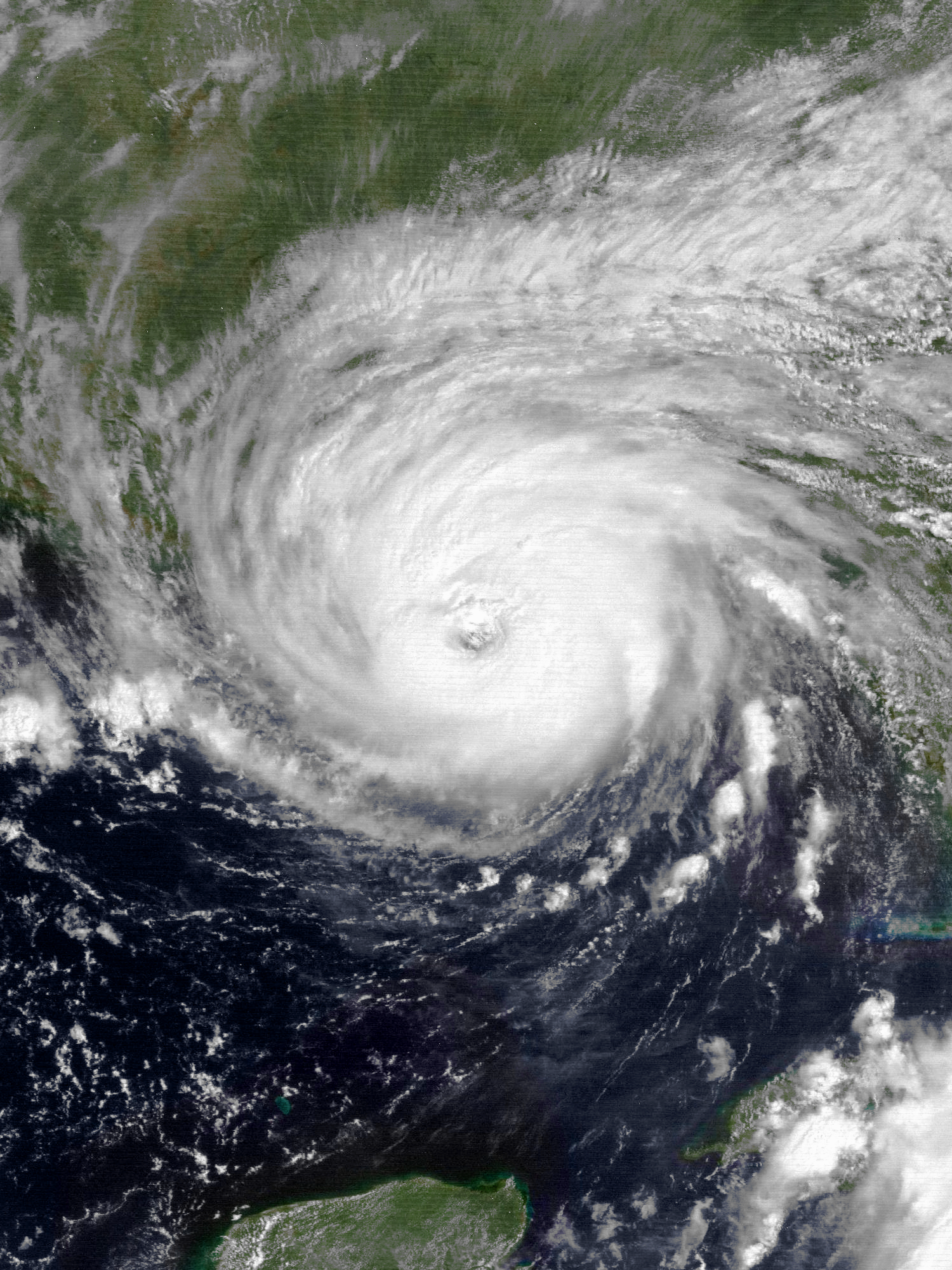
Hurricane Frederic (1979)

The state of Ohio can be impacted by the remnants of both eastern Pacific and Atlantic tropical cyclones, with a bulk of the activity originating in the Gulf of Mexico. Hurricane Frederic in 1979, interacting with a nearby frontal zone, brought over 8 inches (200 mm) of rainfall to isolated spots of the state, becoming the wettest known tropical cyclone, or remnant, to impact Ohio.

Wettest tropical cyclones and their remnants in Ohio Highest-known totals
Precipitation			Storm	Location	Ref.
Rank	mm	in	Storm	Location	Ref.
1	220.2	8.67	Frederic 1979	Akron 30 E	
2	216.7	8.53	Ivan 2004	Albany	
3	201.9	7.95	Frances 2004	Mount Ephraim	
4	178.8	7.04	Sandy 2012	Kirtland 0.9 SW	
5	164.3	6.47	Fran 1996	Elyria 3 E	
6	157.0	6.18	Katrina 2005	Nashville	
7	156.2	6.15	Tico 1983	Ironton 1 NE	
8	138.7	5.46	Isidore 2002	New Carlisle	
9	131.3	5.17	Fred 2021	Pickerington 6 NNW	
10	130.8	5.15	Ida 2021	Granville 5.6 N	

== Oklahoma ==
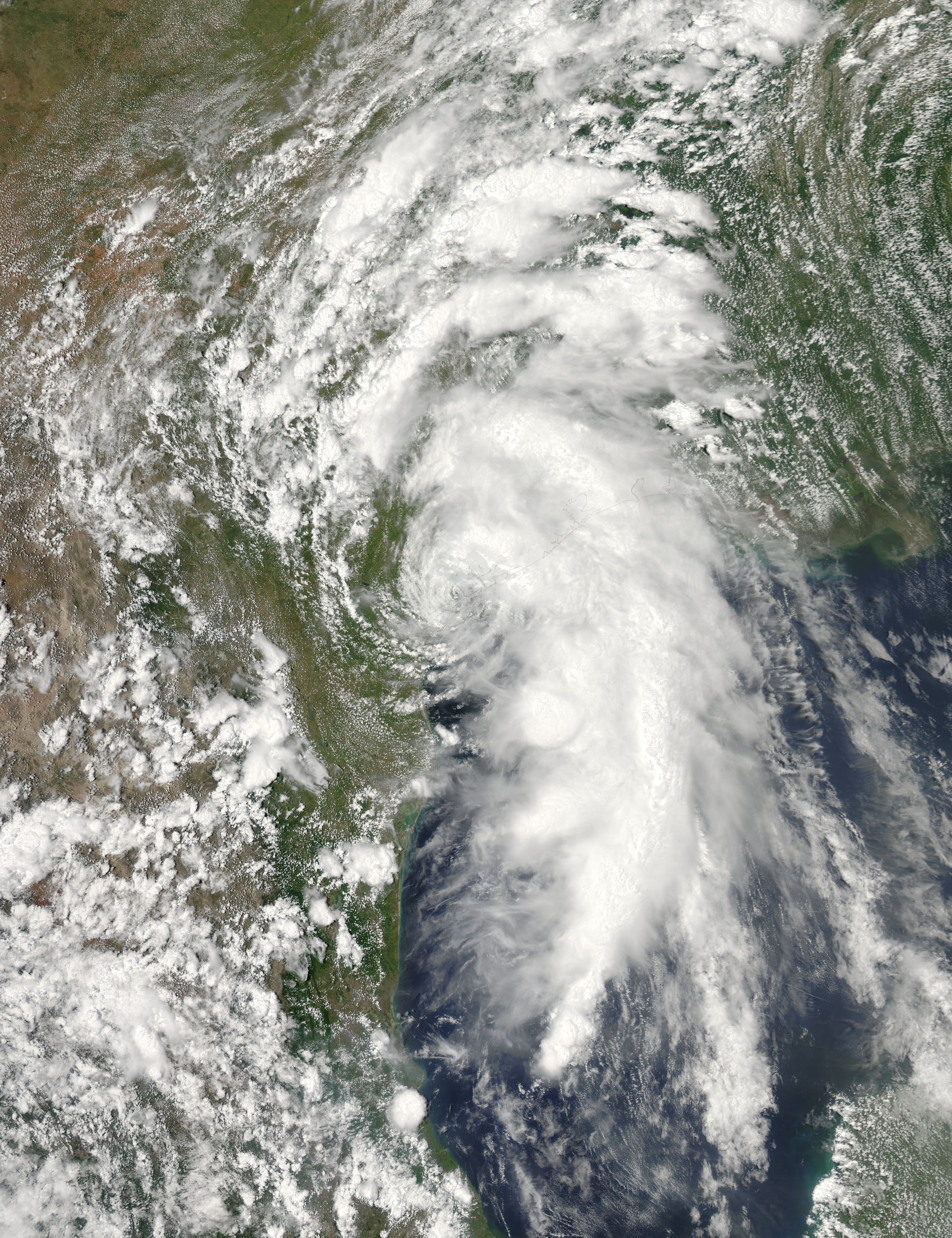
Tropical Storm Bill (2015)

Remnant tropical cyclones can move into the state which originate in either the Pacific or Atlantic hurricane basins. In 2007, Tropical Storm Erin reintensified over Oklahoma leading to heavy rainfall within the state. Rainfall exceeded 12 inches (300 mm) in isolated spots, which turned out to be the fourth wettest tropical cyclone remnant on record for Oklahoma.

Wettest tropical cyclones and their remnants in Oklahoma Highest-known totals
Precipitation			Storm	Location	Ref.
Rank	mm	in	Storm	Location	Ref.
1	475.2	18.71	Norma 1981	Kingston 4 SSE	
2	430.5	16.95	Tico 1983	Just south of Chickasha	
3	401.6	15.81	Nineteen-E 2018	Johnston County	
4	325.4	12.81	Erin 2007	Eakly 3 NE	
5	318.3	12.53	Bill 2015	Healdton 3 E	
6	306.6	12.07	Dean 1995	Great Salt Plains Dam	
7	279.9	11.02	Frances 1998	Valliant 3 W	
8	275.3	10.84	Paine 1986	Ponca City Municipal AP	
9	218.4	8.60	Gilbert 1988	Wichita Mountain Wildlife Refuge	
10	217.7	8.57	Carmen 1974	Flashman Tower	

== Oregon ==
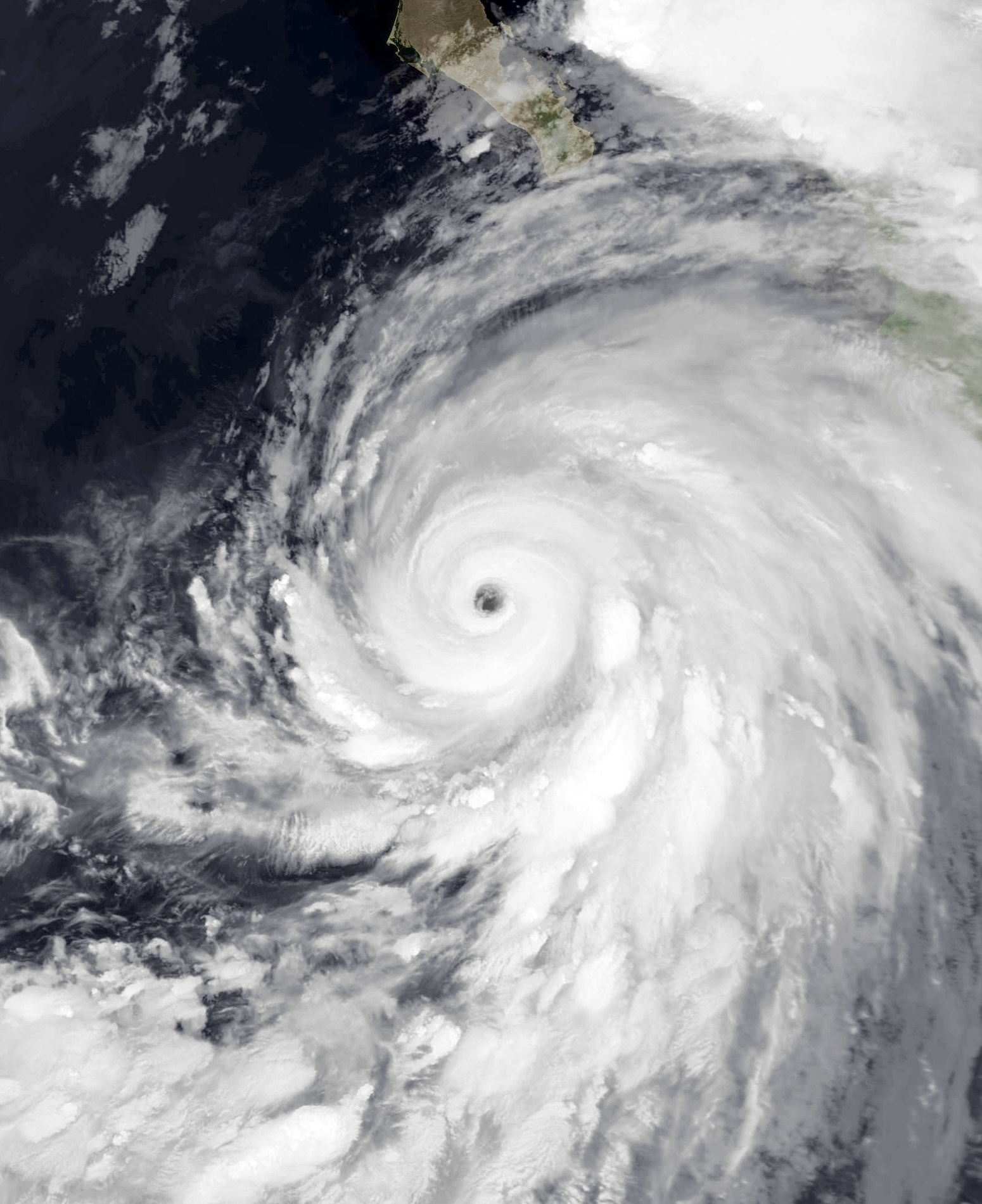
Hilary (2023)

Impacts from tropical cyclones in the Pacific Northwest occur infrequently. Most recently, the remains of Hilary moved through eastern Oregon.

Wettest tropical cyclones and their remnants in Oregon Highest-known totals
Precipitation			Storm	Location	Ref.
Rank	mm	in	Storm	Location	Ref.
1	84	3.29	Hilary 2023	Morgan Mountain	
2	34.3	1.35	Kathleen 1976	Rome 2 NW	
3	32.0	1.26	Ignacio 1997	Crater Lake NPS HQ	

== Pennsylvania ==
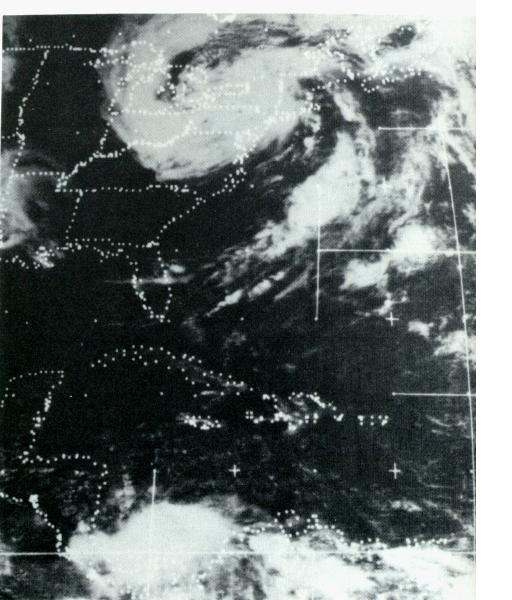
Hurricane Agnes over Pennsylvania

Although Hurricane Agnes was barely a hurricane at landfall in Florida, its major impact was over the Mid-Atlantic region, where Agnes combined with a non-tropical low to produce widespread rains of 6 to 12 inches (150 to 300 mm) with local amounts up to 19 inches (480 mm) in western Schuylkill County in Pennsylvania. These rains produced widespread severe flooding from Virginia northward to New York, with other flooding occurring over the western portions of the Carolinas.

Wettest tropical cyclones and their remnants in Pennsylvania Highest-known totals
Precipitation			Storm	Location	Ref.
Rank	mm	in	Storm	Location	Ref.
1	482.6	19.00	Agnes 1972	Western Schuylkill County	
2	395.9	15.59	Lee 2011	Elizabethtown	
3	337.3	13.28	Six 1933	York	
4	308.1	12.13	Floyd 1999	Marcus Hook	
5	306.1	12.05	Connie 1955	Geigertown	
6	301.2	11.86	Eloise 1975	Capital City Airport, near Harrisburg	
7	282.2	11.11	Diane 1955	Pecks Pond	
8	239.5	9.43	Ida 2021	Coatesville	
9	232.9	9.17	Gloria 1985	Valley Forge	
10	227.8	8.97	Jeanne 2004	West Chester	

== Puerto Rico ==
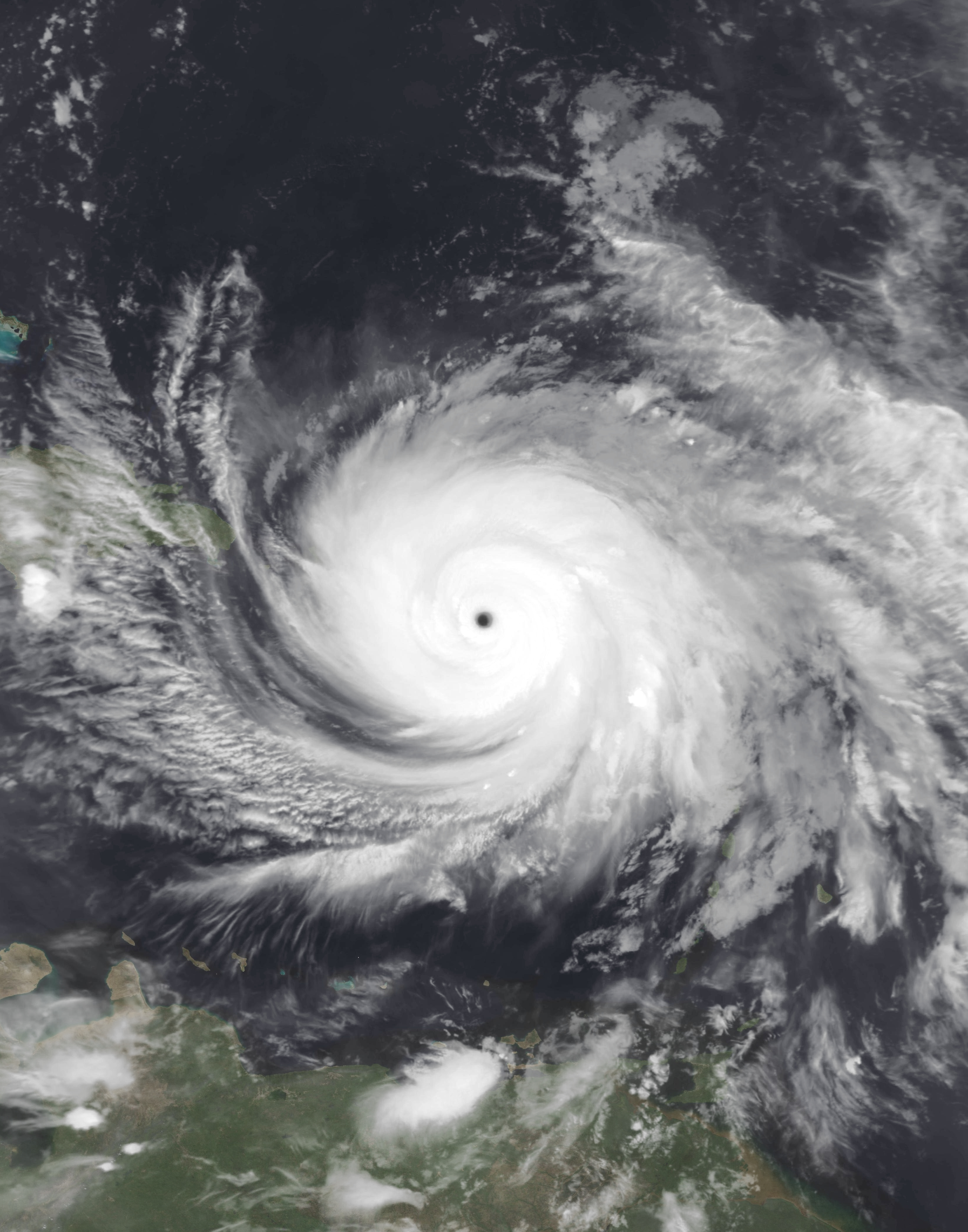
Hurricane Maria

Puerto Rico has seen dramatic rainfall from tropical cyclones and their precursor disturbances. The most recent tropical cyclone-related deluge was from Hurricane Irene in August 2011, when 22.05 inches (560 mm) of rain was measured at Gurabo Abajo. The heaviest rainfall noted over the past 30 years was from the precursor disturbance to Tropical Storm Isabel, when 31.67 inches (804 mm) fell at Toro Negro Forest. Hurricane Eloise of 1975 dropped 33.29 inches (846 mm) of rainfall at Dos Bocas, with 23.07 inches (586 mm) falling in 24 hours.

Wettest tropical cyclones and their remnants in Puerto Rico Highest-known totals
Precipitation			Storm	Location	Ref.
Rank	mm	in	Storm	Location	Ref.
1	1,058.7	41.68	Fifteen 1970	Jayuya 1 SE	
2	962.7	37.90	Maria 2017	Caguas	
3	845.6	33.29	Eloise 1975	Dos Bocas	
4	822.9	32.40	Fiona 2022	Marueno	
5	804.4	31.67	Isabel 1985	Toro Negro Forest	
6	775.0	30.51	Georges 1998	Jayuya	
7	751.8	29.60	San Felipe II 1928	Adjuntas	
8	662.2	26.07	Hazel 1954	Toro Negro Tunnel	
9	652.5	25.69	Klaus 1984	Guavate Camp	
10	596.4	23.48	Hortense 1996	Cayey 1 NW	

== Rhode Island ==
Hurricane Bob

The flood from Hurricane Diane led to a significant death toll (nearly 200) from Pennsylvania eastward through southern New England.

Wettest tropical cyclones and their remnants in Rhode Island Highest-known totals
Precipitation			Storm	Location	Ref.
Rank	mm	in	Storm	Location	Ref.
1	309.9	12.2	Unnamed 1932	Westerly	
2	239.5	9.43	Ida 2021	Uri Peckham Farm	
3	214.6	8.45	Diane 1955	Greenville	
4	181.1	7.13	Bob 1991	North Foster	
5	175.3	6.90	Unnamed 1924	Kingston	
6	149.9	5.90	Floyd 1999	North Foster 1 E	
7	145.8	5.74	Connie 1955	Kingston	
8	137.2	5.40	Lee 2011	Coventry Center	
9	136.4	5.37	Irene 2011	Warren	
10	133.4	5.25	Allison 2001	North Foster	

== South Carolina ==
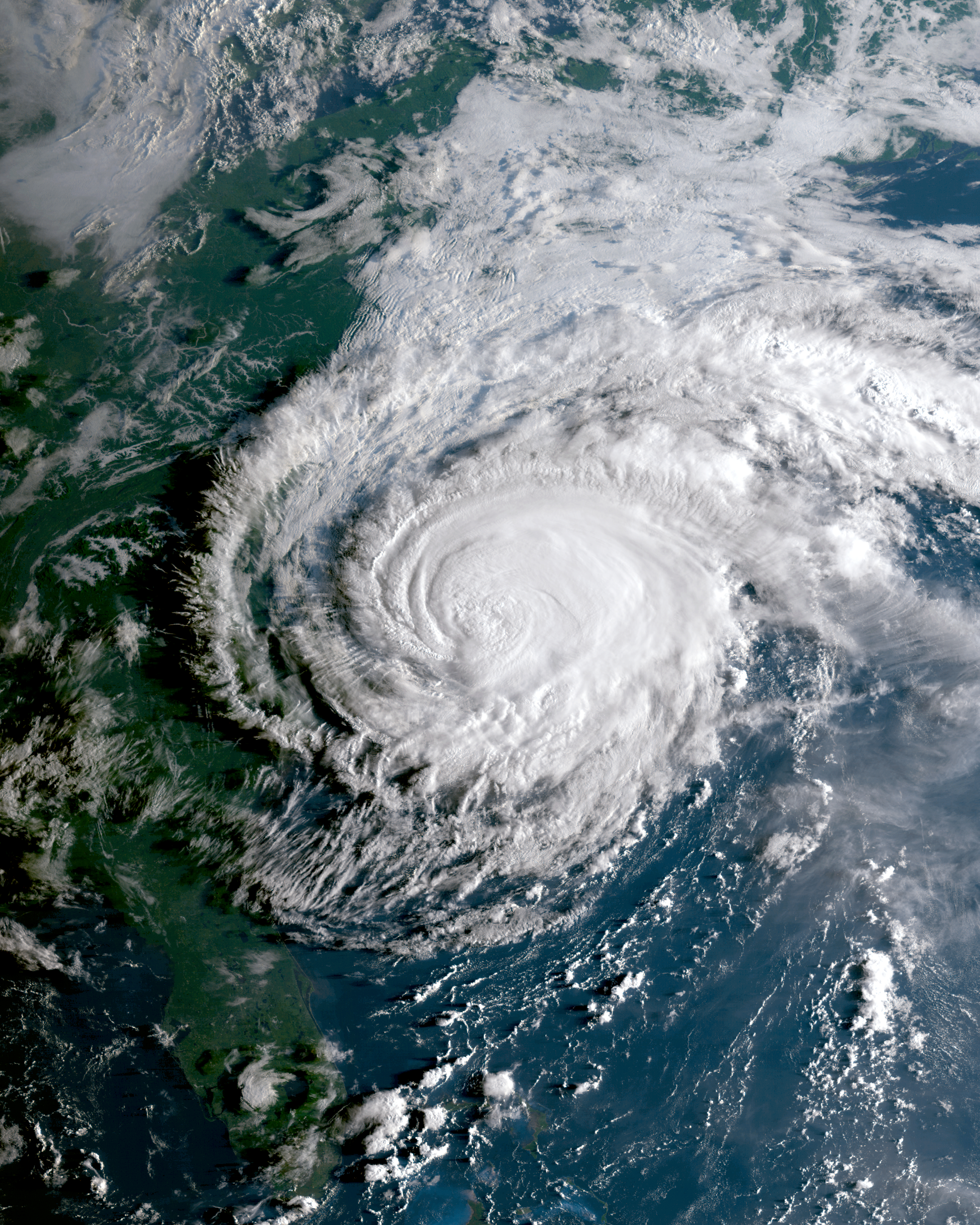
Hurricane Florence

Portions of South Carolina experienced significant rainfall totals eclipsing 35 inches (890 mm) with Hurricane Florence, which became the wettest known tropical cyclone to impact the state. The flash flooding covered numerous roadways and washed out bridges. River flooding was great across the state. In addition, the rainfall broke dams, flooded houses, and covered fields.

Wettest tropical cyclones and their remnants in South Carolina Highest-known totals
Precipitation			Storm	Location	Ref.
Rank	mm	in	Storm	Location	Ref.
1	600.2	23.63	Florence 2018	Loris	
2	550.1	21.66	Helene 2024	Sunfish Mountain	
3	470.2	18.51	Jerry 1995	Antreville	
4	463.6	18.25	Debby 2024	Summerville	
5	443.2	17.45	Beryl 1994	Jocassee 8 WNW	
6	429.3	16.90	Matthew 2016	Edisto Island	
7	407.9	16.06	Floyd 1999	Myrtle Beach Airport	
8	386.3	15.21	Dorian 2019	Pawleys Island	
9	358.4	14.11	T. D. #8 1971	Sullivans Island	
10	354.6	13.96	Marco/Klaus 1990	Pageland	

== South Dakota ==
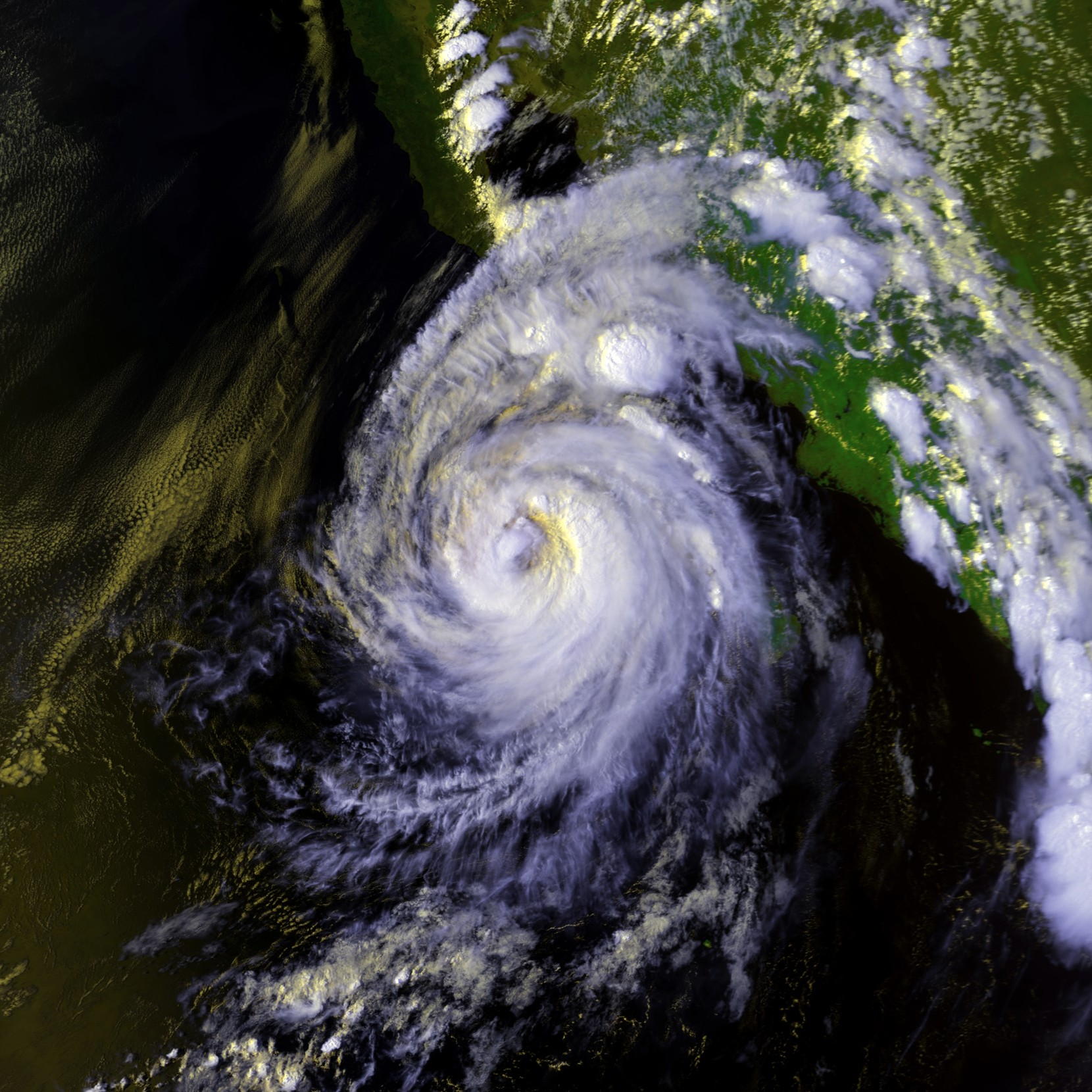
Hurricane Lester (1992)

It is rare for tropical cyclone remnants originating from the eastern Pacific or Atlantic Basins to move as far inland as South Dakota. The remains of Javier in 2004 dropped locally heavy rainfall exceeding 2 inches (51 mm) in localized spots.

Wettest tropical cyclones and their remnants in South Dakota Highest-known totals
Precipitation			Storm	Location	Ref.
Rank	mm	in	Storm	Location	Ref.
1	83.6	3.29	Lester 1992	Armour	
2	71.9	2.83	Javier 2004	Gregory	

== Tennessee ==
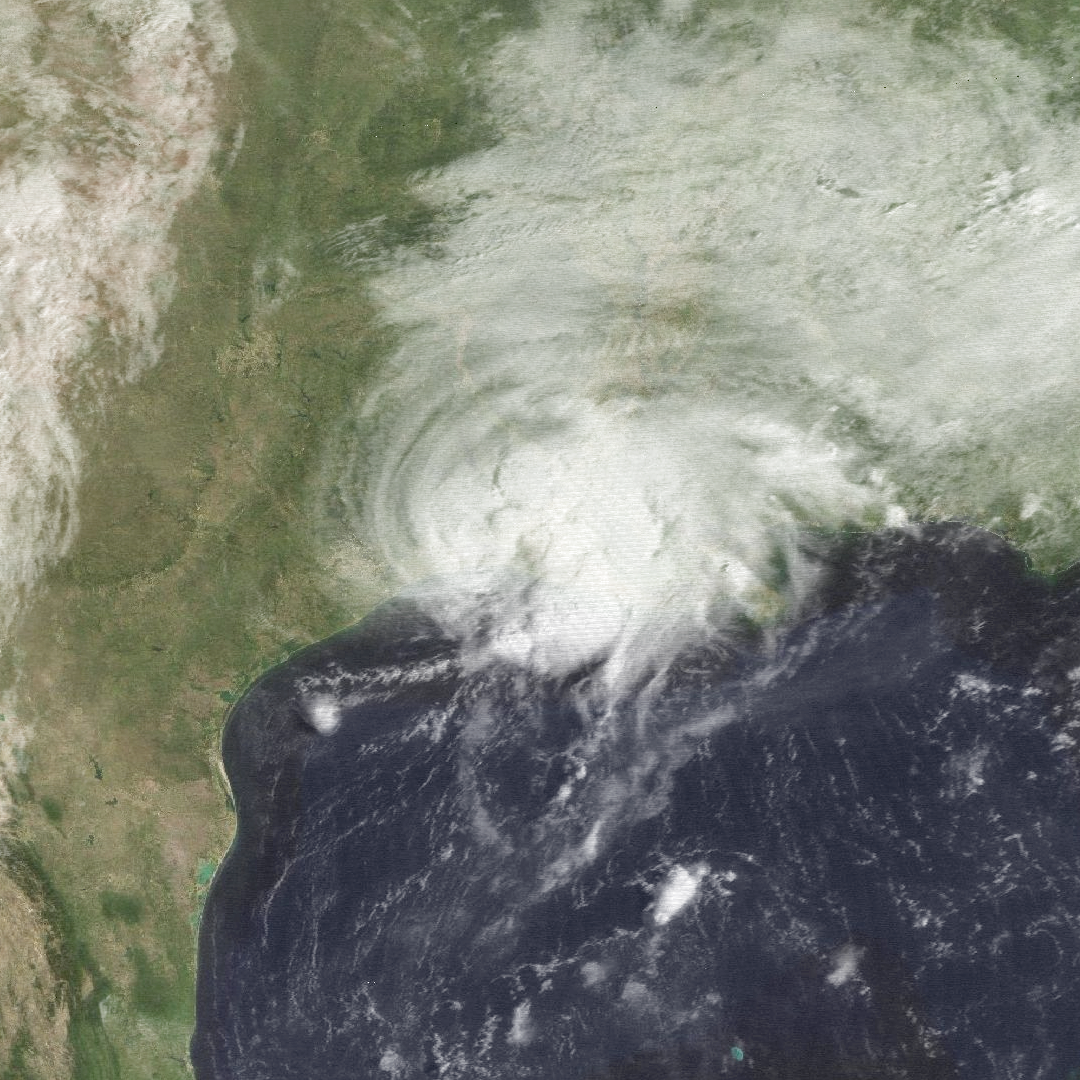
Tropical Storm Chris (1982)

Tropical Storm Chris moved inland into the Southeast, producing a burst of rainfall across Tennessee exceeding 13 inches (330 mm). This system stands as Tennessee's wettest known tropical cyclone.

Wettest tropical cyclones and their remnants in Tennessee Highest-known totals
Precipitation			Storm	Location	Ref.
Rank	mm	in	Storm	Location	Ref.
1	345.4	13.60	Chris 1982	Milan	
2	332.9	13.11	Lee 2011	Charleston	
3	285.8	11.25	Ivan 2004	Soddy Daisy Mowbray Mt	
4	267.2	10.52	Isidore 2002	Big Sandy	
5	232.9	9.17	Harvey 2017	Port Royal	
6	232.7	9.16	Francine 2024	Nonconnah Creek	
7	226.6	8.92	Helene 2024	Benton 2.3 ESE	
8	213.1	8.39	Allison 1989	Murfreesboro 5 N	
9	185.7	7.31	Gracie 1959	Roan High Knob	
10	183.6	7.23	Easy 1950	Point Park Lookout Mountain	

== Texas ==
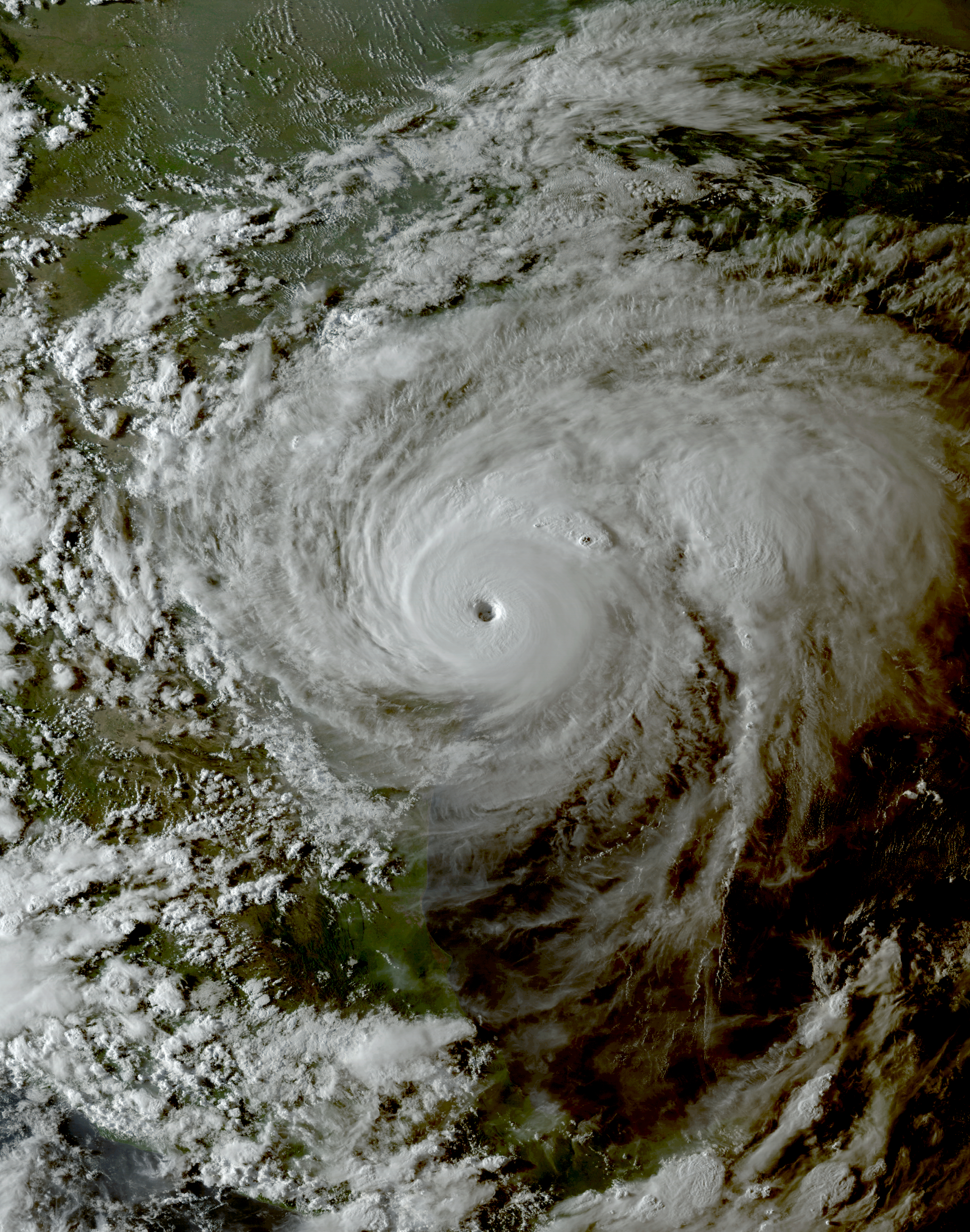
Hurricane Harvey (2017)

The most serious threat from tropical cyclones in Texas residents is from flooding, from both Gulf of Mexico hurricanes and tropical storms and the remnants of Eastern Pacific storms. Systems with sprawling circulations, such as Hurricane Beulah, also tend to make good rainmakers. Slow moving systems, such as Tropical Storm Amelia or Hurricane Harvey also can produce significant rainfall over Texas. Harvey's storm total rainfall is the most recorded within the United States. Harvey's extremely heavy rainfall produced catastrophic flooding across much of southeastern Texas; particularly in and around the Houston metropolitan area, where accumulations exceeded 40 in (1,000 mm) over a four-day period. Tropical Storm Claudette holds the national 24-hour rainfall record for the United States, with 42 inches (1,100 mm) falling within a day.

Wettest tropical cyclones and their remnants in Texas Highest-known totals
Precipitation			Storm	Location	Ref.
Rank	mm	in	Storm	Location	Ref.
1	1538.7	60.58	Harvey 2017	Nederland	
2	1219.2	48.00	Amelia 1978	Medina	
3	1143.0	45.00	Claudette 1979	Alvin coop site	
4	1102	43.39	Imelda 2019	North Fork Taylor Bayou	
5	1033.3	40.68	Allison 2001	Moore Road Detention Pond	
6	1008.6	39.71	September Hurricane 1921	Thrall	
7	762.0	30.00	September T.S. 1936	Broome	
8	755.9	29.76	Unnamed 1960	Port Lavaca #2	
9	695.5	27.38	Beulah 1967	Pettus	
10	688.3	27.10	Alice 1954	Pandale	

== United States Virgin Islands ==
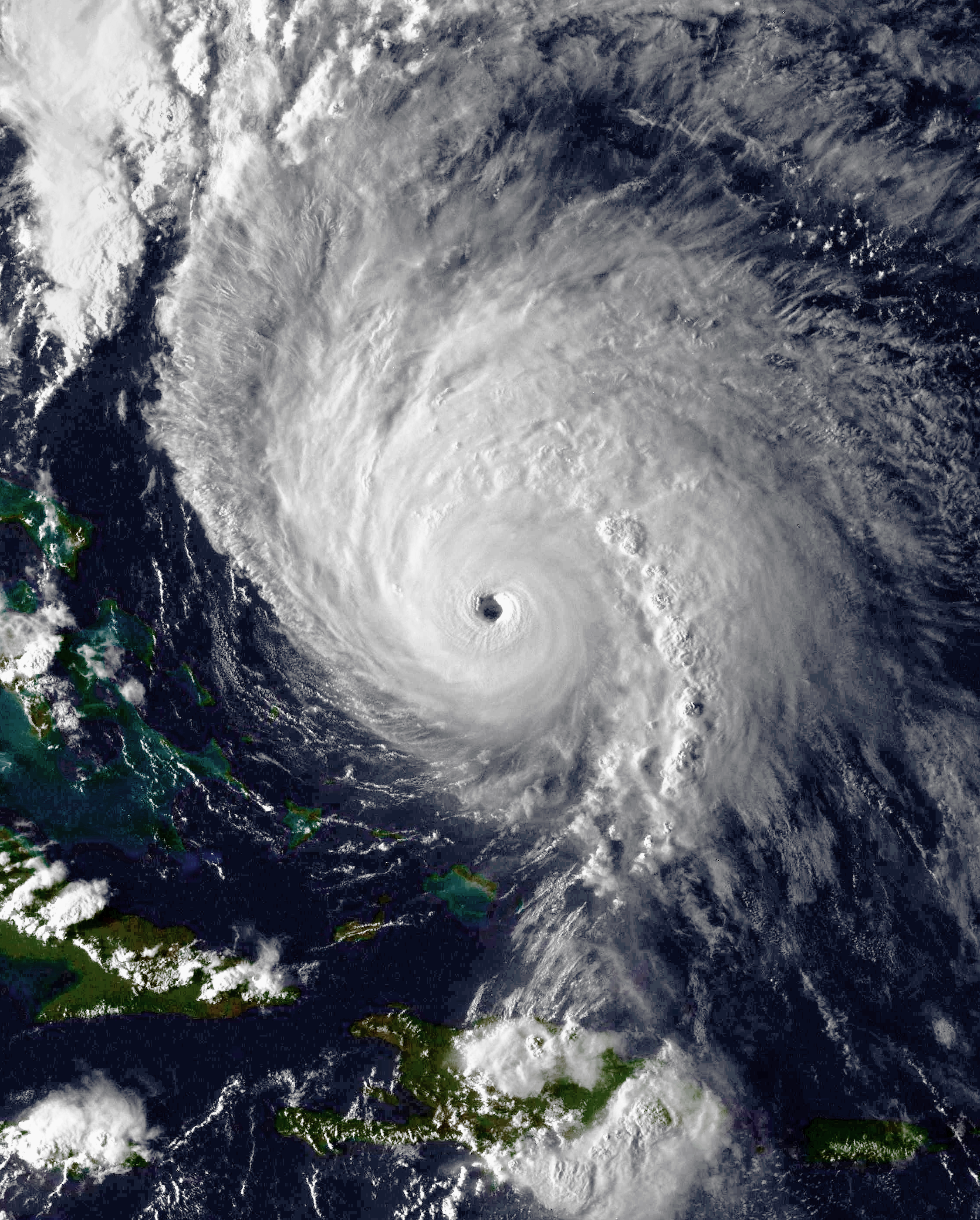
Hurricane Hortense (1996)

Tropical cyclones affect these islands of the northeast Caribbean on a regular basis. Hurricane Hortense is the wettest known system for the U. S. Virgin Islands, bringing over 18 inches (460 mm) of rainfall.

Wettest tropical cyclones and their remnants in the United States Virgin Islands Highest-known totals
Precipitation			Storm	Location	Ref.
Rank	mm	in	Storm	Location	Ref.
1	458.0	18.03	Hortense 1996	Christiansted Hamilton Field	
2	394.5	15.53	Klaus 1984	Caneel Bay Plantation	
3	293.4	11.55	David 1979	Fredericksted Fort	
4	284.5	11.20	Hugo 1989	Ham Bluff Light House Station	
5	265.9	10.47	Lenny 1999	Granard	
6	234.2	9.22	Eloise 1975	Annaly	
7	224.0	8.82	Kendra 1978	Fredericksted Fort	
8	221.2	8.71	Isabel 1985	Annually	
9	154.4	6.05	Grace 1997	Wintberg	
10	147.0	5.80	Dorian 2019	Anna's Retreet's	

== Utah ==
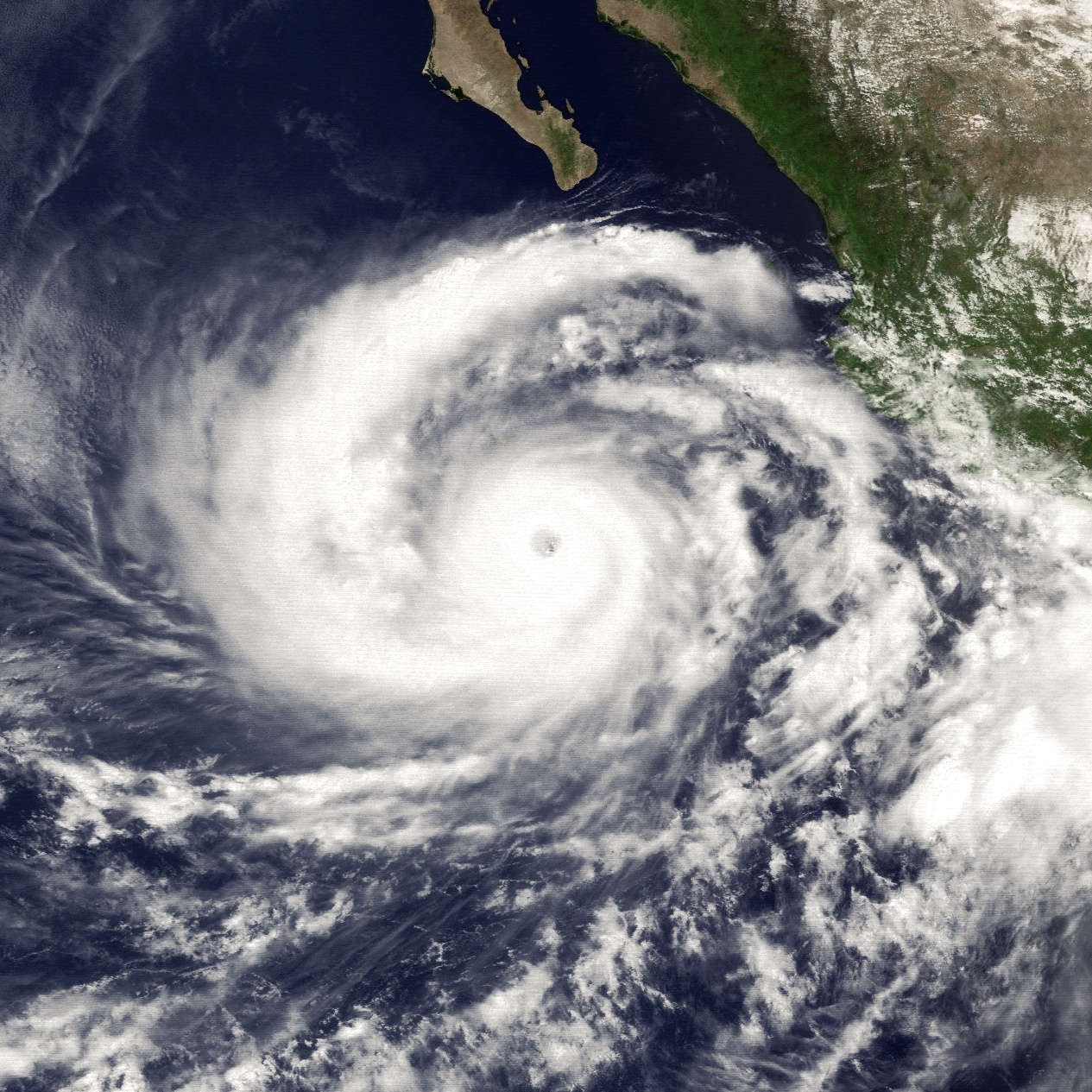
Olivia 1982

On occasion, Utah is impacted by the remnants of eastern Pacific tropical cyclones. The remains of Olivia moved through the region in 1982, spurring spotty moderate to heavy rainfall exceeding 7 inches (180 mm) in isolated spots.

Wettest tropical cyclones and their remnants in Utah Highest-known totals
Precipitation			Storm	Location	Ref.
Rank	mm	in	Storm	Location	Ref.
1	188.2	7.41	Olivia 1982	Cottonwood Weir	
2	109.5	4.31	Doreen 1977	Logan 5 SW Experimental Farm	
3	61.7	2.43	Javier 2004	Monticello 15 ESE	
4	59.4	2.34	Boris 1990	Bartholomew Powerhouse	
5	56.1	2.21	Nora 1997	Enterprise	
6	48.0	1.89	Lester 1992	Cedar City and New Harmony	
7	38.6	1.52	Isis 1998	La Verkin	
8	33.8	1.33	Kathleen 1976	New Harmony	

== Vermont ==
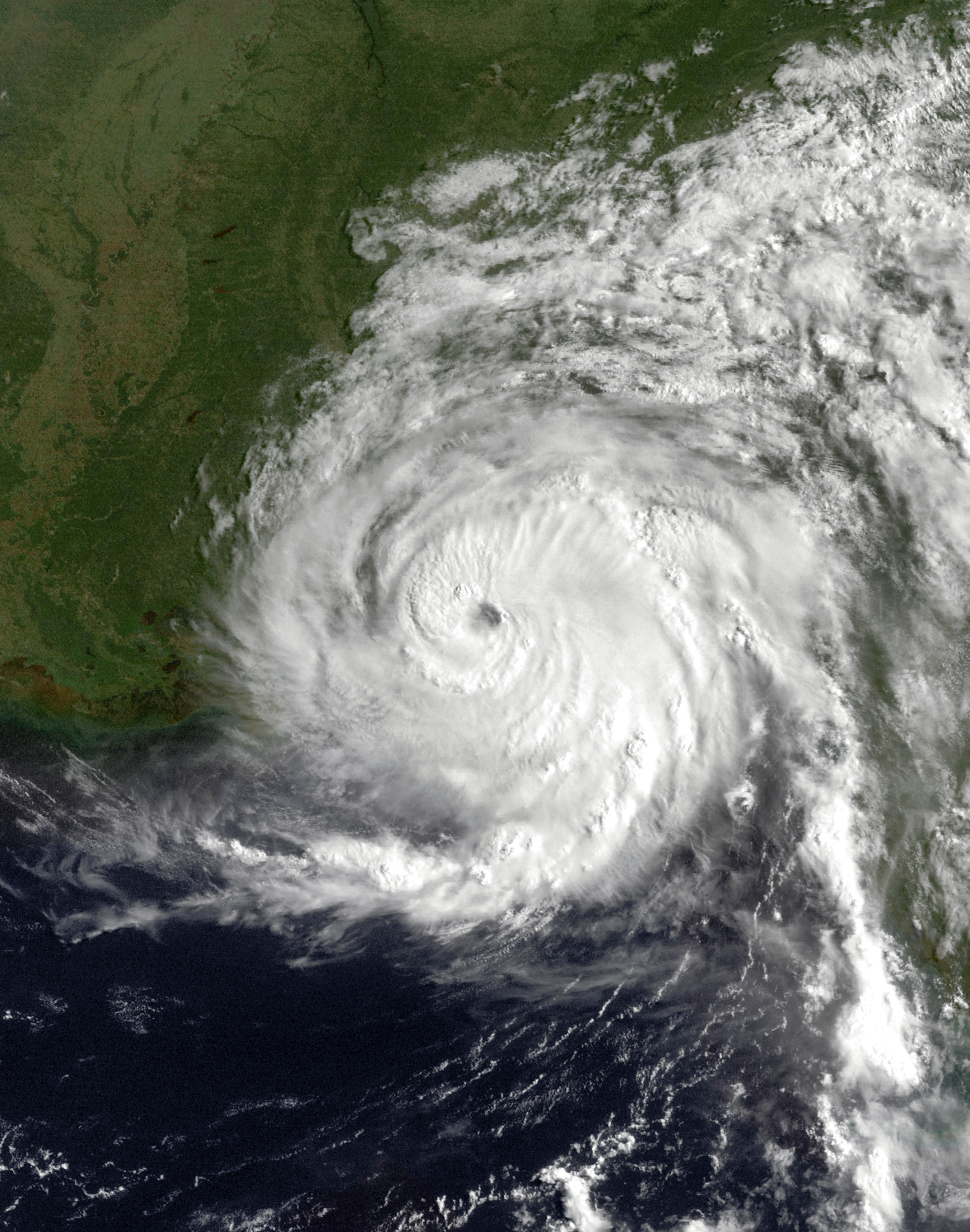
Hurricane Erin

A large swath over heavy rainfall spread up the East Coast along a frontal zone draped over the northern side of Hurricane Floyd. Over 11 inches (280 mm) fell across portions of Vermont, the most recorded during the passage of a tropical cyclone or its remnants within the state.

Wettest tropical cyclones and their remnants in Vermont Highest-known totals
Precipitation			Storm	Location	Ref.
Rank	mm	in	Storm	Location	Ref.
1	292.9	11.53	Floyd 1999	Mount Mansfield	
2	285.2	11.23	Irene 2011	Mendon	
3	209.8	8.26	Connie 1955	Whitingham 1 W	
4	171.7	6.76	Beryl 2024	Hinesburg	
5	171.2	6.70	Erin 1995	Morrisville Stowe State Park	
6	167.9	6.61	Lee 2011	Pownal	
7	160.8	6.33	Donna 1960	Somerset	
8	145.5	5.73	Bertha 1996	Dorset 2 SE	
9	126.5	4.98	Chris 1988	Vernon	
10	124.7	4.91	Eloise 1975	Vernon	

== Virginia ==
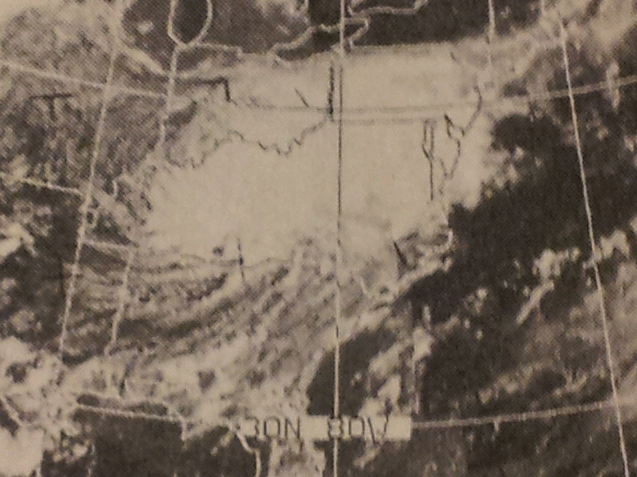
Camille impacting Virginia on August 20, 1969.

Virginia has some special considerations that affect tropical cyclone-related rainfall. Mountains to the west act as a perfect mechanism for upward motion during sustained east winds, which can lead to flash flooding and landslides in that region (e.g. Hurricane Camille). As a tropical system approaches from the south, a frontal zone sets up between the moist Atlantic Ocean and the drier landmass to the west. This boundary can set up two or three days in advance of a tropical storm, and can lead up to prolonged heavy rains across coastal sections (e.g. Hurricane Floyd). As the cyclone advances north, the boundary will slowly shift west, but progresses west of a Richmond/Washington, D.C. line.

Wettest tropical cyclones and their remnants in Virginia Highest-known totals
Precipitation			Storm	Location	Ref.
Rank	mm	in	Storm	Location	Ref.
1	685.8	27.00	Camille 1969	West-Central Nelson County	
2	532.4	20.96	Lee 2011	Colonial Beach	
3	513.1	20.20	Isabel 2003	Upper Sherando	
4	480.1	18.9	October 1942 T.S.	Big Meadows	
5	457.2	18.0	Ida 2009	Hampton 1.8 NW	
6	444.5	17.50	Southeast hurricane 1940	Keysville	
7	431.3	16.98	Floyd 1999	Williamsburg 2 N	
8	406.4	16.00	Fran 1996	Big Meadows	
9	364.0	14.33	Cleo 1964	Back Bay Wildlife Refuge	
10	360.9	14.21	Matthew 2016	Chesapeake	

== Washington ==
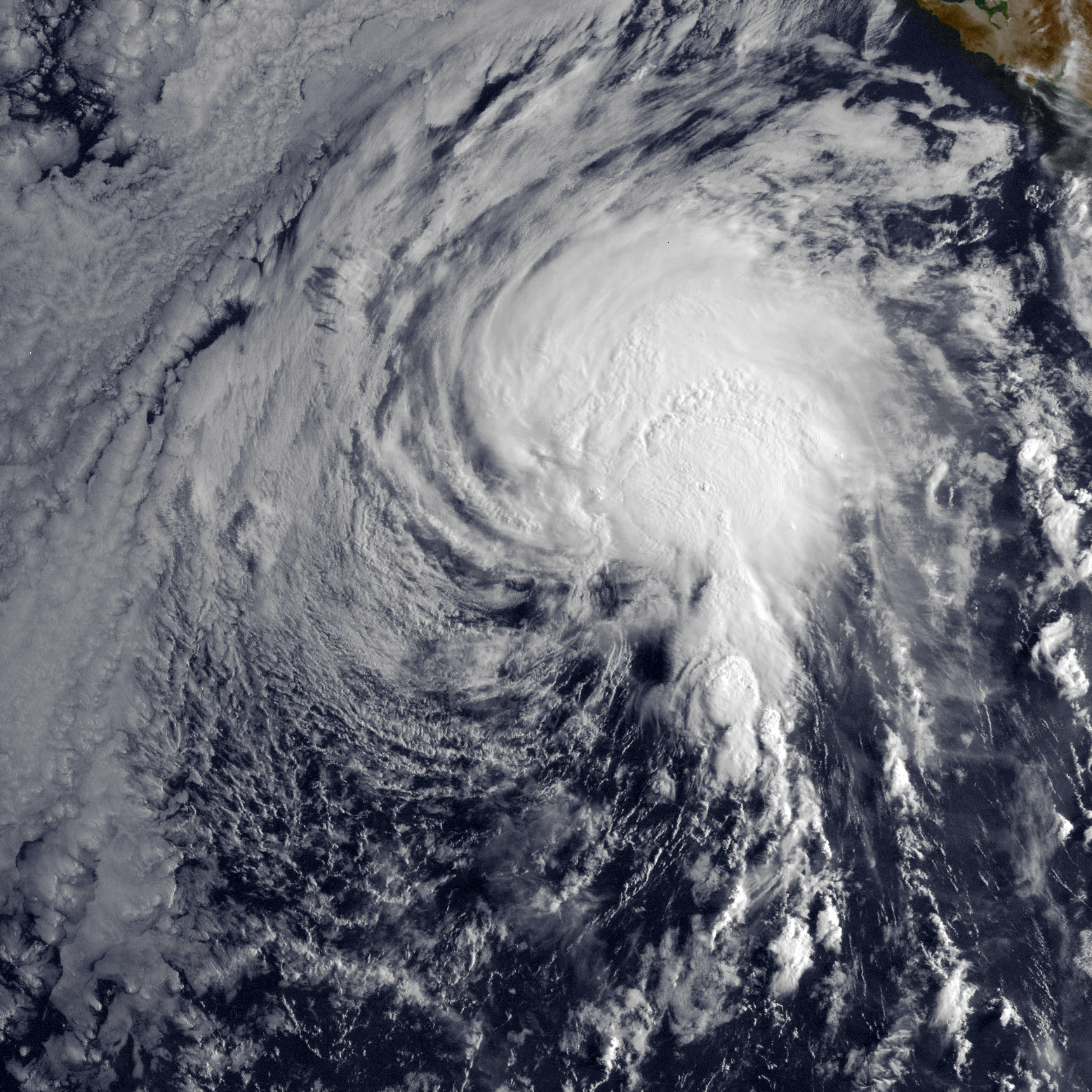
Tropical Storm Ignacio (1997)

Impacts from tropical cyclones in the Pacific Northwest are rare. The remains of Ignacio moved through the region, spurring spotty moderate rainfall across the region.

Wettest tropical cyclones and their remnants in Washington Highest-known totals
Precipitation			Storm	Location	Ref.
Rank	mm	in	Storm	Location	Ref.
1	18.3	0.72	Ignacio 1997	Merwin Dam	

== West Virginia ==
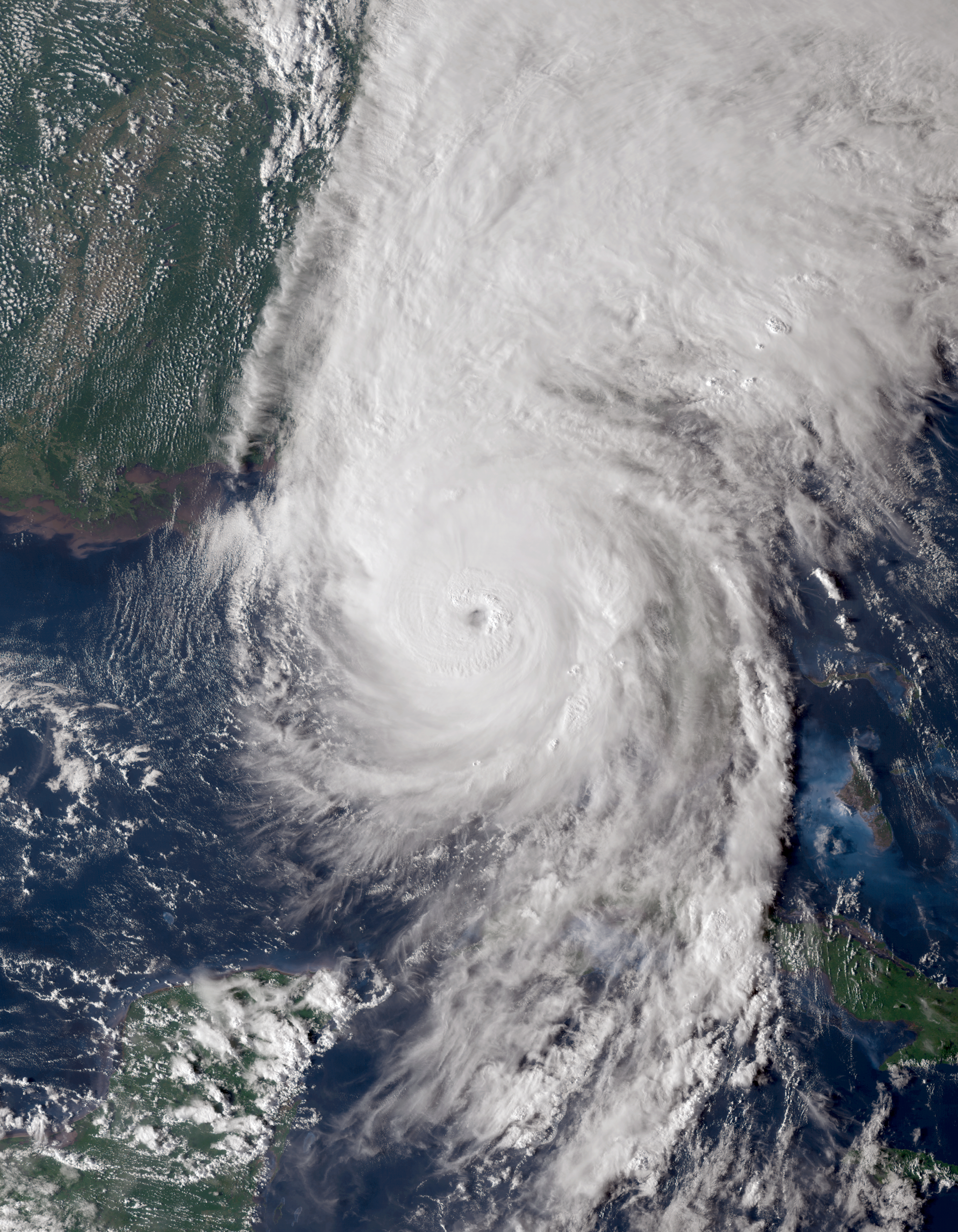
Hurricane Helene (2024)

Although Hurricane Agnes was barely a hurricane at landfall in Florida, its major impact was over the Mid-Atlantic region, where Agnes combined with a non-tropical low to produce widespread heavy rainfall, including amounts approaching 8 inches (200 mm) in isolated spots of West Virginia. These rains produced widespread severe flooding from Virginia northward to New York, with other flooding occurring over the western portions of the Carolinas.

Wettest tropical cyclones and their remnants in West Virginia Highest-known totals
Precipitation			Storm	Location	Ref.
Rank	mm	in	Storm	Location	Ref.
1	201.7	7.94	Agnes 1972	Berkeley Springs	
2	181.6	7.15	Helene 2024	Elkhorn	
3	180.0	7.09	Lee 2011	Mt. Storm	
4	175.3	6.90	Hazel 1954	Mathias	
5	174.5	6.87	Eloise 1975	Brushy Run	
6	152.9	6.02	Frances 2004	Berkeley Springs	
7	151.9	5.98	Debby 2024	Harpers Ferry	
8	141.5	5.57	Gracie 1959	Wardensville RM Farm	
9	136.9	5.39	Fred 2021	Athens	
10	136.1	5.36	Connie 1955	Kearneysville	

== Wisconsin ==
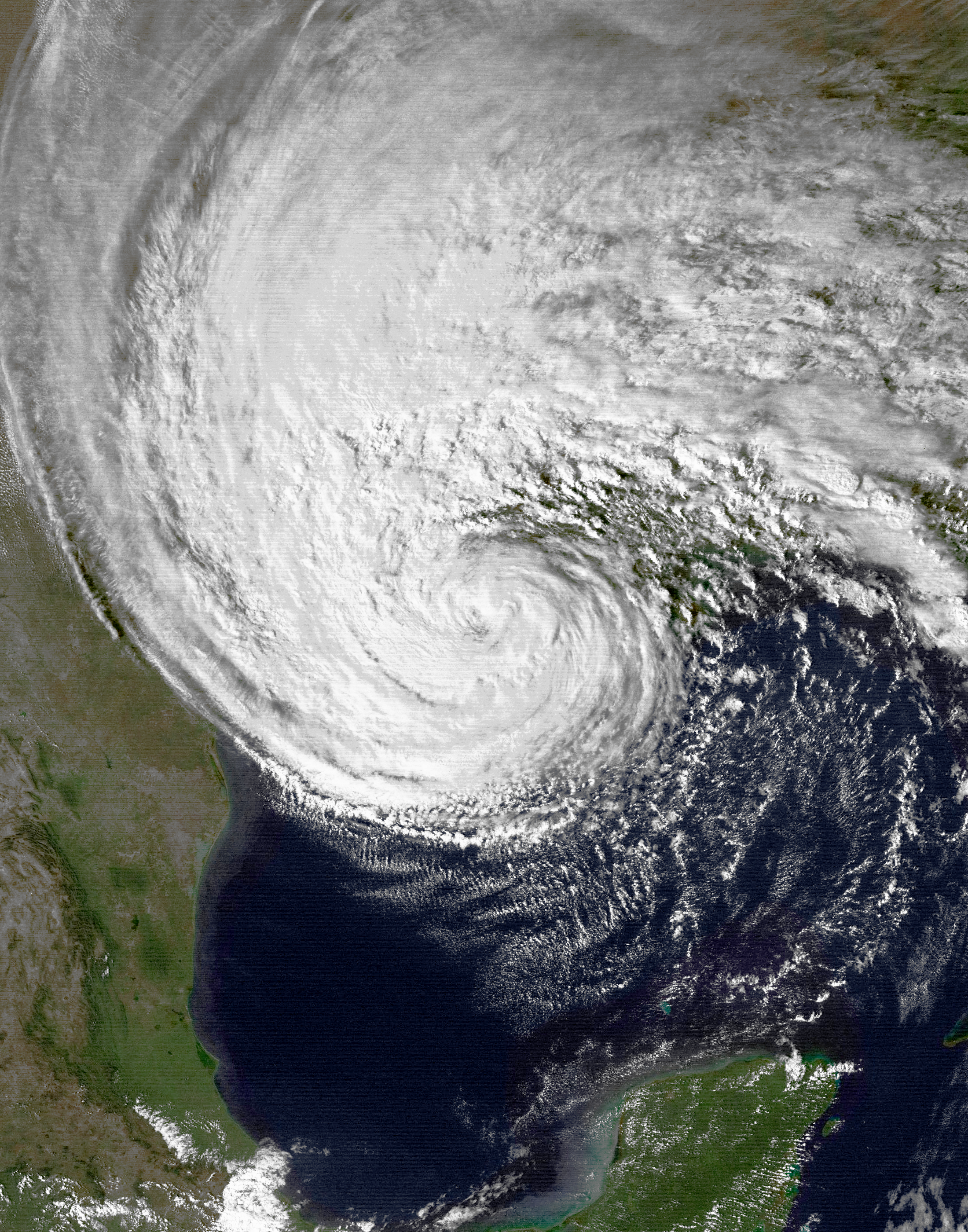
Hurricane Juan (1985)

Wisconsin experienced its heaviest tropical-cyclone-related rainfall in 1961 when Hurricane Carla entered the United States. Carla broke the record for highest rainfall in three other states as well.

Wettest tropical cyclones and their remnants in Wisconsin Highest-known totals
Precipitation			Storm	Location	Ref.
Rank	mm	in	Storm	Location	Ref.
1	192.5	7.58	Carla 1961	Brodhead	
2	124.5	4.90	Juan 1985	Marinette	
3	95.3	3.75	Frances 1998	Darlington	
4	93.2	3.67	Chantal 1989	Port Washington	
5	84.6	3.33	Cristobal 2020	Augusta 4 NW	
6	83.8	3.30	Newton 1986	Beloit	
7	79.8	3.14	Gustav 2008	Kenosha	
8	71.9	2.83	Lester 1992	Blue Mounds 6 SSE	
9	71.9	2.83	Unnamed 1960	Eau Pleine Reservoir	
10	68.1	2.68	Alberto 2018	New London 1 ENE	

== Wyoming ==
Javier (2004)

Few tropical cyclone remnants originating from the eastern Pacific make it as far north as Wyoming. Most recently, Hurricane Javier dropped locally heavy rainfall of up to 2 inches (51 mm) in the higher terrain of western Wyoming.

Wettest tropical cyclones and their remnants in Wyoming Highest-known totals
Precipitation			Storm	Location	Ref.
Rank	mm	in	Storm	Location	Ref.
1	50.80	2.00	Javier 2004	Encampment 19 WNW	
2	25.90	1.02	Boris 1990	Bitter Creek 4 NE	

== See also ==
- List of the wettest tropical cyclones
- List of the wettest tropical cyclones by country
- Tropical cyclone rainfall climatology
- United States rainfall climatology
- United States tropical cyclone rainfall climatology
