= 2004 Pacific hurricane season =

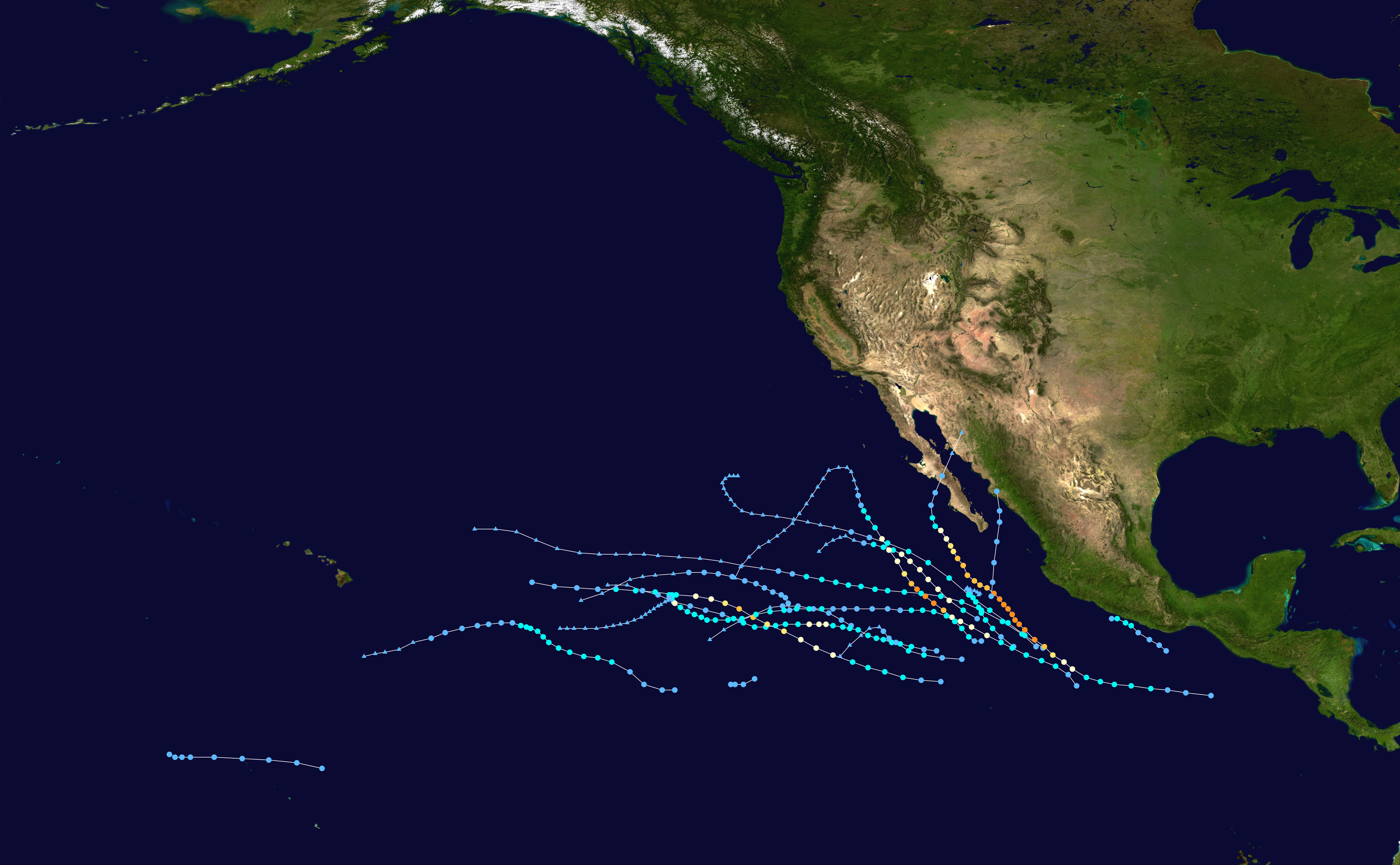
- Season summary map

Seasonal boundaries
- First system formed: May 22, 2004
- Last system dissipated: October 26, 2004

Strongest storm
- Name: Javier
  - Maximum winds: 150 mph (240 km/h) (1-minute sustained)
  - Lowest pressure: 930 mbar (hPa; 27.46 inHg)

Seasonal statistics
- Total depressions: 17, 1 unofficial
- Total storms: 12
- Hurricanes: 6
- Major hurricanes (Cat. 3+): 3
- Total fatalities: None, 3 missing
- Total damage: None

Related articles
- Timeline of the 2004 Pacific hurricane season; 2004 Atlantic hurricane season; 2004 Pacific typhoon season; 2004 North Indian Ocean cyclone season

The 2004 Pacific hurricane season was an overall below-average Pacific hurricane season in which there were 12 named tropical storms, all of which formed in the eastern Pacific basin (east of 140°W and north of the equator). Of these, 6 became hurricanes, and 3 of those intensified into major hurricanes. No storms made landfall in 2004, the first such occurrence since 1991. In addition to the season's 12 named storms, there were five tropical depressions that did not reach tropical storm status. One of them, Sixteen-E, made landfall in northwestern Sinaloa. The season officially began on May 15 in the eastern Pacific, and on June 1 in the central Pacific basin (between140°W and the International Date Line, north of the equator). It officially ended in both basins on November 30. These dates conventionally delimit the period during each year when most tropical cyclones form in each respective basin. These dates conventionally delimit the period during each year when a majority of tropical cyclones form. The season was reflected by an accumulated cyclone energy (ACE) index of 71 units. The lack of notable activity was brought on due to the presence of a Modoki El Niño - a rare type of El Niño in which unfavorable conditions exist in the eastern Pacific basin due to the normally warmer-than-average waters shifting further westward.

Impact throughout the season was minimal and no deaths were recorded. In early August, the remnants of Hurricane Darby contributed to localized heavy rainfall in Hawaii, causing minor street and stream flooding; coffee and macadamia trees were damaged as well. In early September, Hurricane Howard resulted in significant flooding across the Baja California peninsula that damaged agricultural land and 393 homes. Large swells also resulted in about 1,000 lifeguard rescues in California. In mid-September, Javier, the strongest hurricane of the season, caused three fishermen to go missing and helped alleviate a multi-year drought across the Southwest United States. It produced record rainfall in the state of Wyoming. In mid- to late October, Tropical Storm Lester and Tropical Depression Sixteen-E each dumped heavy rain upon parts of Mexico, resulting in minor flood and mudslide damage.

== Seasonal forecasts ==
Predictions of tropical activity in the 2004 season
Source	Date	Named storms	Hurricanes	Major hurricanes	Ref
Average (1966–2003)		16	9	3
Record high activity		27	16 (tie)	11
Record low activity		8 (tie)	3	0† (tie)
SMN	January 2004	15	6	3
SMN	May 17, 2004	14	7	2
NOAA	May 21, 2004	13–15	6-8	2-4
SMN	August 2004	13	6	3
	Actual activity	12	6	3

In January 2004, the Servicio Meteorológico Nacional (SMN) released their first prediction for tropical cyclone activity throughout the Northeast Pacific. Based on a Neutral El Niño Southern Oscillation (ENSO), a total of 15 named storms, 6 hurricanes, and 3 major hurricanes was forecast. These values were slightly altered in May to 14 named storms, 7 hurricanes, and 2 major hurricanes, and again in August to 13 named storms, 6 hurricanes, and 3 major hurricanes.

On May 17, the National Oceanic and Atmospheric Administration issued its seasonal forecast for the 2004 central Pacific season, predicting four or five tropical cyclones to form or cross into the basin. Likewise to the SMN, near average activity was expected largely as a result of a Neutral ENSO. The organization issued its experimental eastern Pacific outlook on May 21, highlighting a 45 percent change of below-average activity, 45 percent chance of near-average activity, and only a 10 percent chance of above-average activity in the basin. A total of 13 to 15 named storms, 6 to 8 hurricanes, and 2 to 4 major hurricanes was forecast.

== Seasonal summary ==
Least intense Pacific hurricane seasons
Rank	Season	ACE value
1	1977	22.3
2	2010	51.2
3	2007	51.6
4	1996	53.9
5	2003	56.6
6	1979	57.4
7	2004	71.1
8	1981	72.8
9	2013	74.8
10	2020	77.3

Activity was below average throughout the season. Altogether there were 12 named storms, 6 of which became hurricanes, and 3 of those intensified into major hurricanes, compared to the long-term average of 16 named storms, 9 hurricanes, and 3 major hurricanes.

The season's first storm, Agatha, developed on May 22. No tropical cyclones developed during June, below the average of 2 named storms and 1 hurricane, and also the first time since 1969 that the month was cyclone-free. The first hurricane of the season was Celia, which briefly reached Category 1 strength on July 22. It was soon followed by Darby, the first major Hurricane of the season and the first in the Eastern Pacific since Kenna in 2002. Later, on September 14, Javier attained sustained winds of 150 mph (240 km/h), making it the strongest hurricane of the season.

Overall wind energy output was reflected with an ACE index value of 71 units for the season. Although vertical wind shear was near average and ocean temperatures were slightly warmer than average south of Mexico, anomalously cool waters and drier than average air mass existed in the central portions of the eastern Pacific. Anomalously strong mid-level ridging extending from the Atlantic to northern Mexico steered a majority of the season's cyclones toward this inhospitable region and also acted to steer all the system of tropical storm intensity or stronger away from land.

== Systems ==
=== Tropical Storm Agatha ===
- Tropical storm (SSHWS)
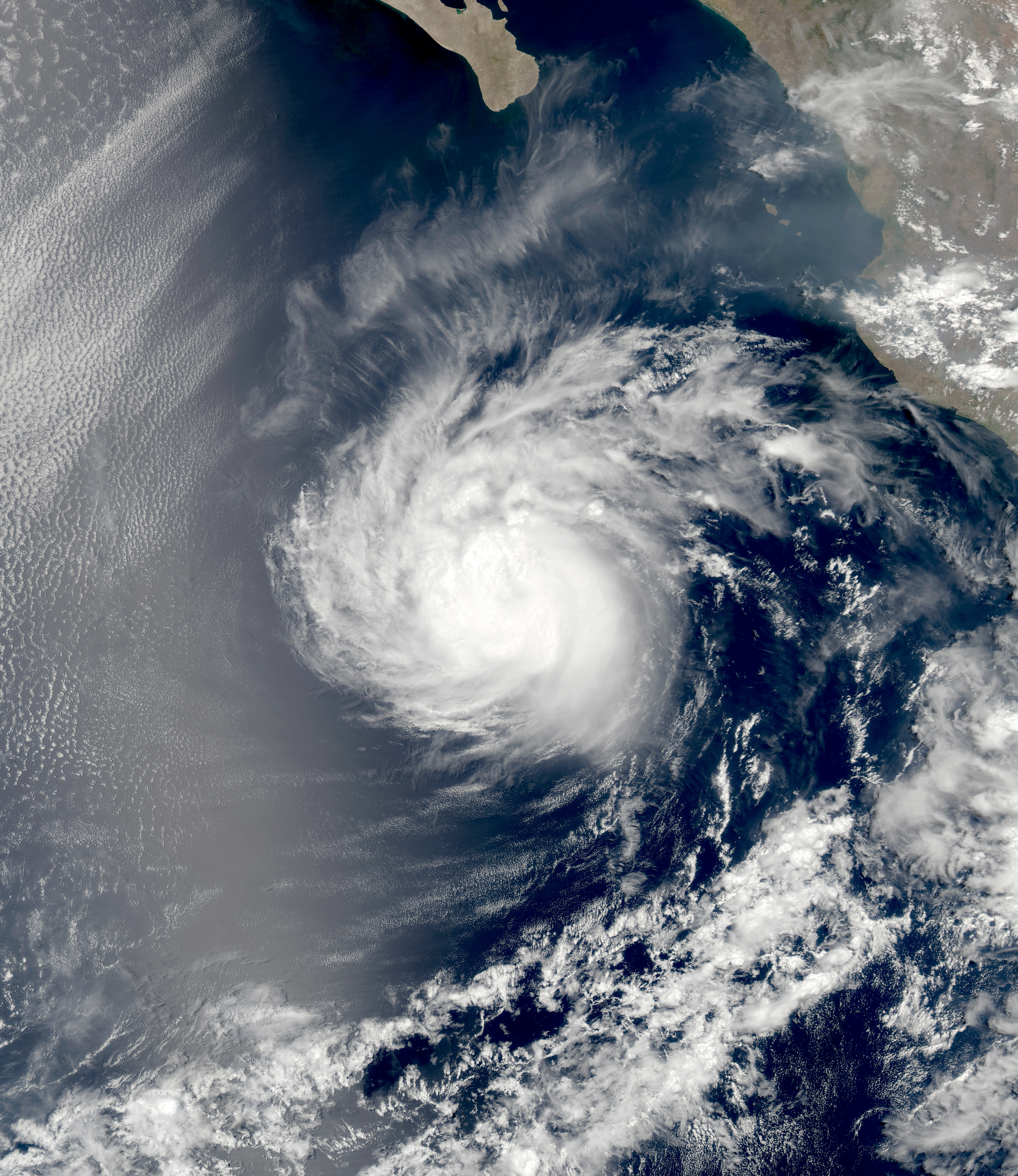
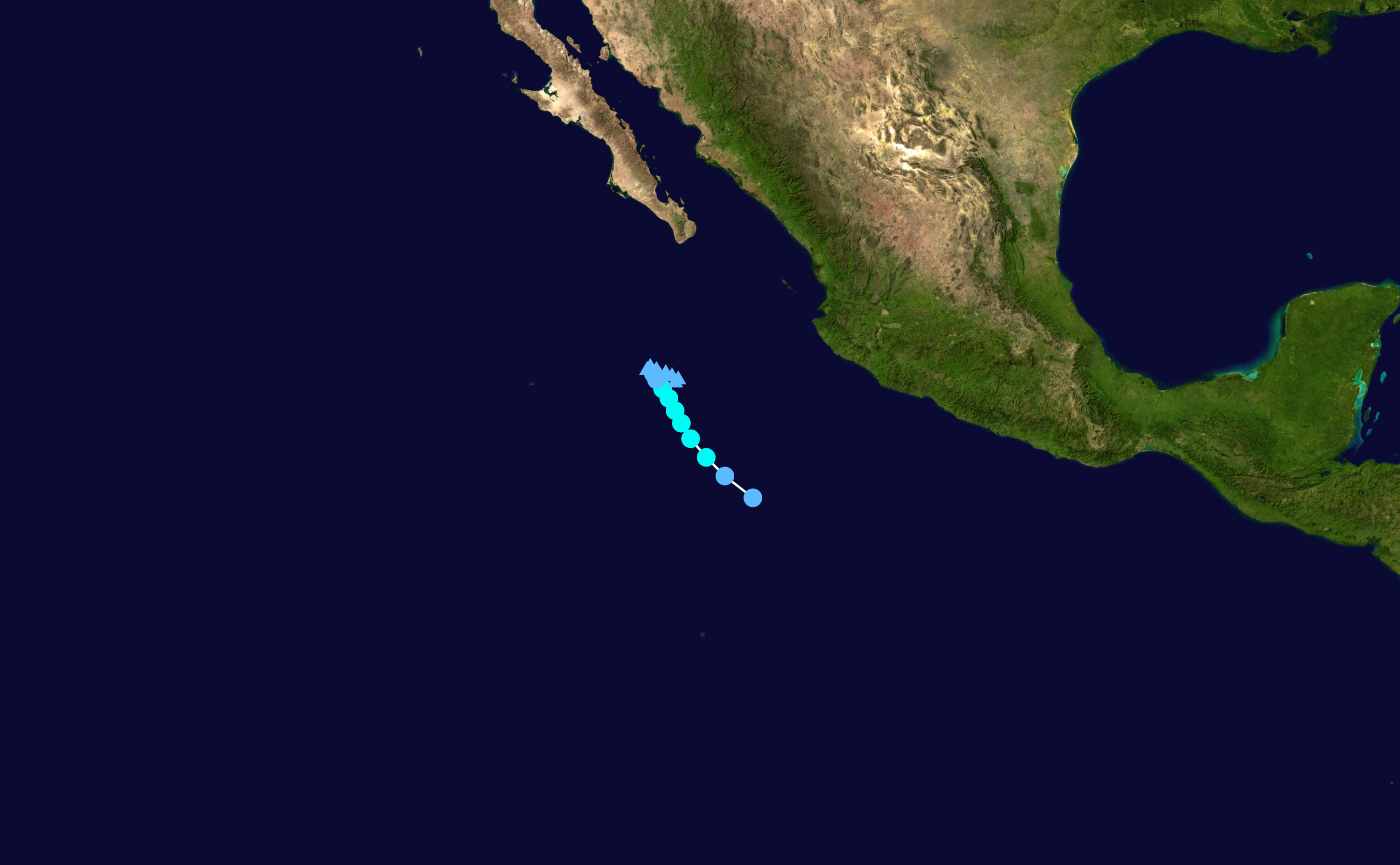
- Duration: May 22 – May 24
- Peak intensity: 60 mph (95 km/h) (1-min); 997 mbar (hPa)

A nearly stationary trough stretched from the eastern Pacific into the eastern Caribbean Sea during mid-May. An ill-defined tropical wave crossed Central America on May 17 and interacted with the trough, eventually leading to the formation of a tropical depression at 00:00 UTC on May 22. The newly formed cyclone moved northwest parallel to the coastline of Mexico while steadily organizing in a low wind shear regime, intensifying into Tropical Storm Agatha by 12:00 UTC that day and attaining peak winds of 60 mph (97 km/h) twelve hours later. Increasingly cool ocean temperatures and a drier air mass caused Agatha to weaken quickly thereafter, and it degenerated into a remnant low by 12:00 UTC on May 24. The post-tropical cyclone drifted aimlessly before dissipating well south of the Baja California Peninsula on May 26.

=== Tropical Depression Two-E ===
- Tropical depression (SSHWS)
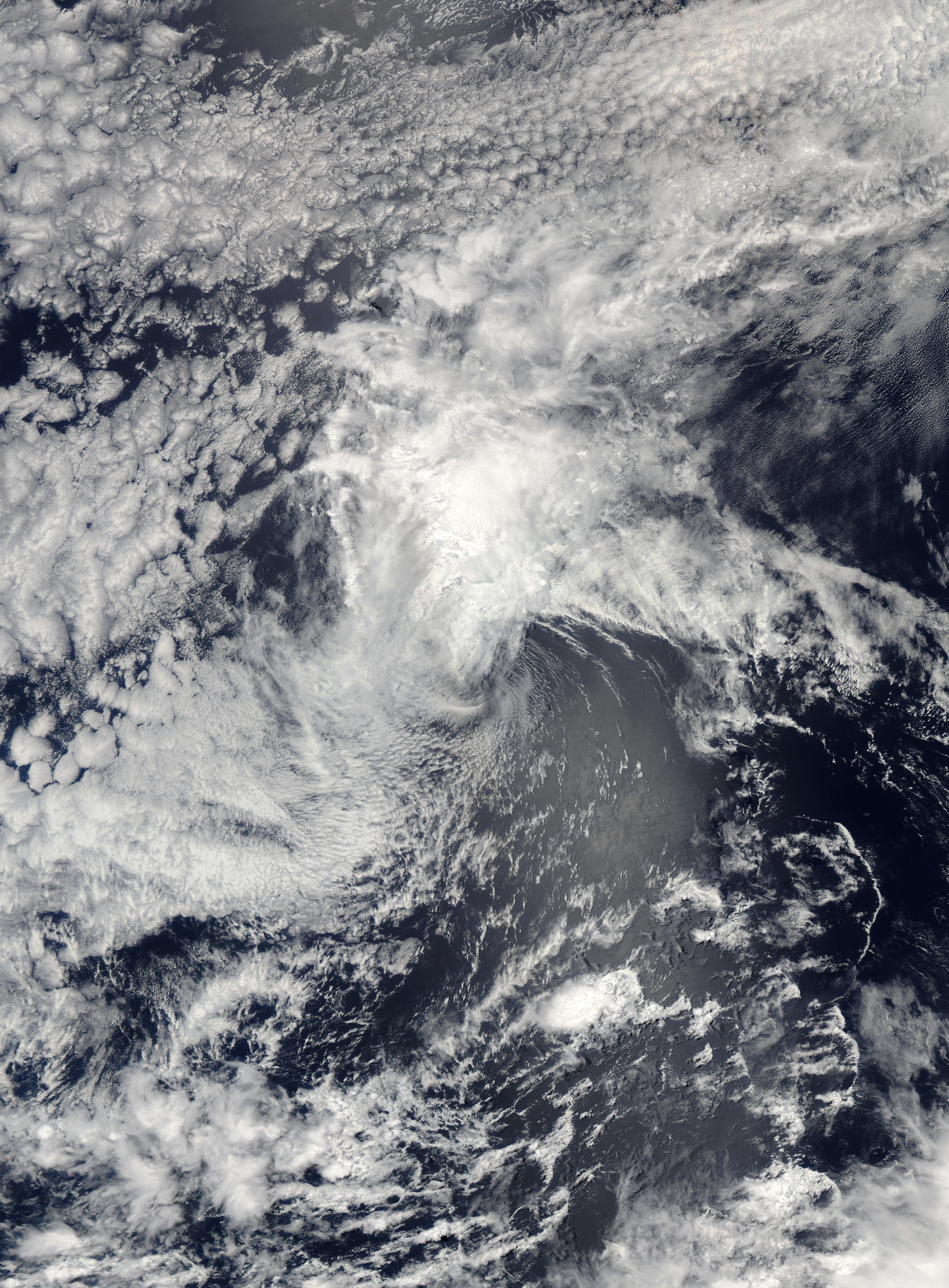
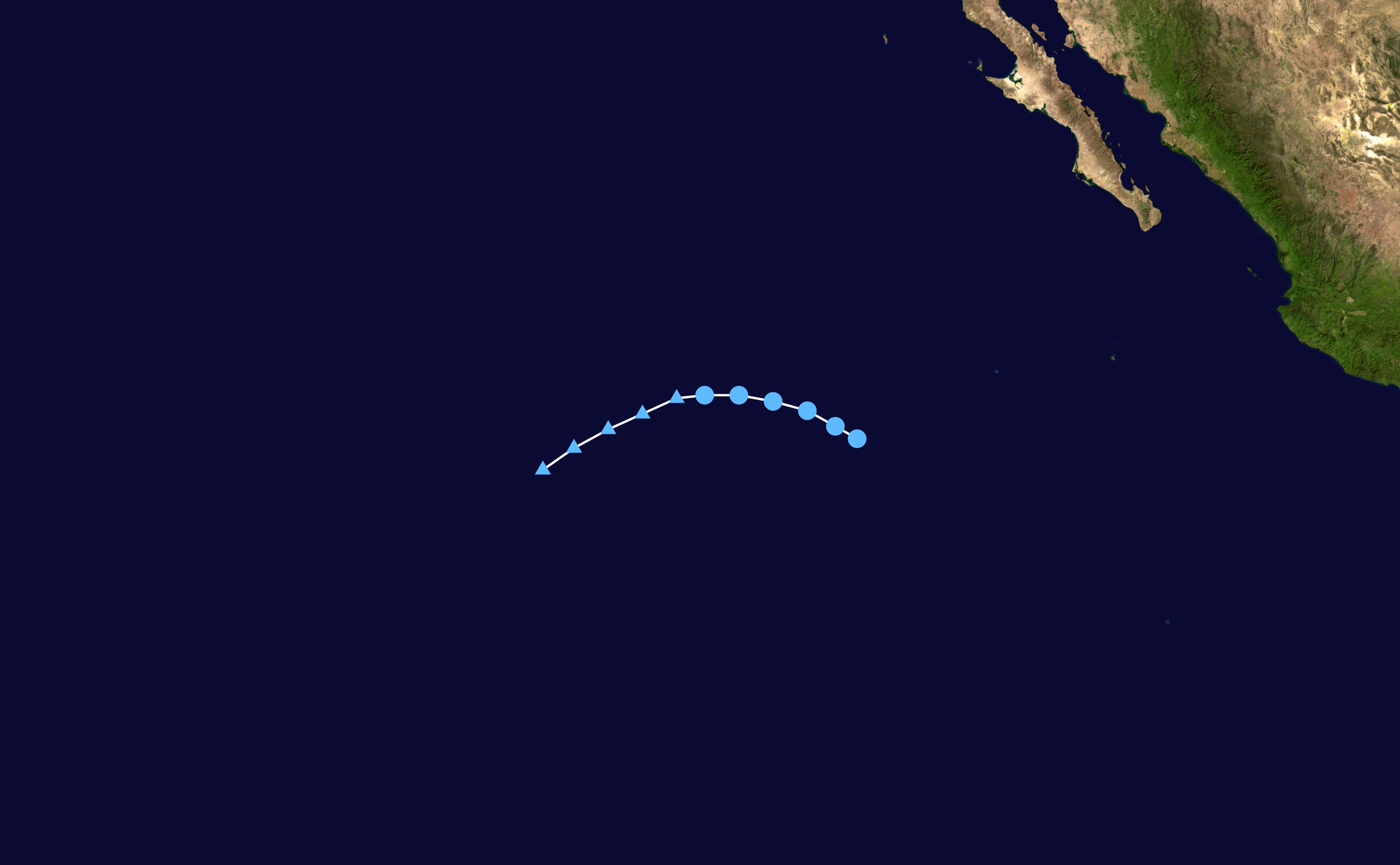
- Duration: July 2 – July 3
- Peak intensity: 35 mph (55 km/h) (1-min); 1007 mbar (hPa)

A westward-moving tropical wave from Africa crossed Central America into the eastern Pacific in late June, coalescing into a tropical depression at 12:00 UTC on July 2 well southwest of the southern tip of the Baja California Peninsula. Steered westward by low-level flow, the depression failed to organize amid wind shear and cooler sea surface temperatures, instead degenerating into a remnant low at 00:00 UTC on July 4. The post-tropical cyclone dissipated a day later.

=== Tropical Depression One-C ===
- Tropical depression (SSHWS)
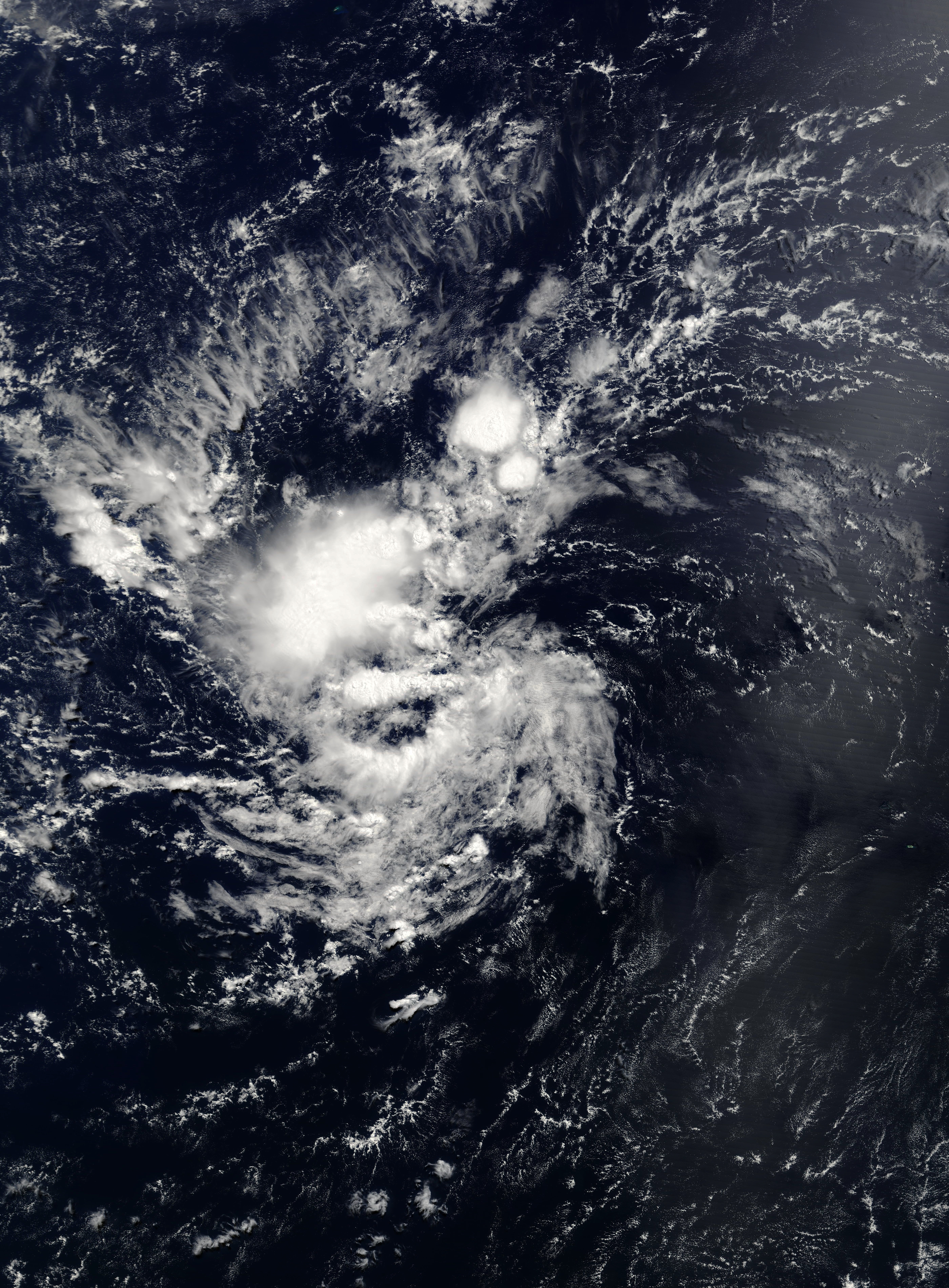
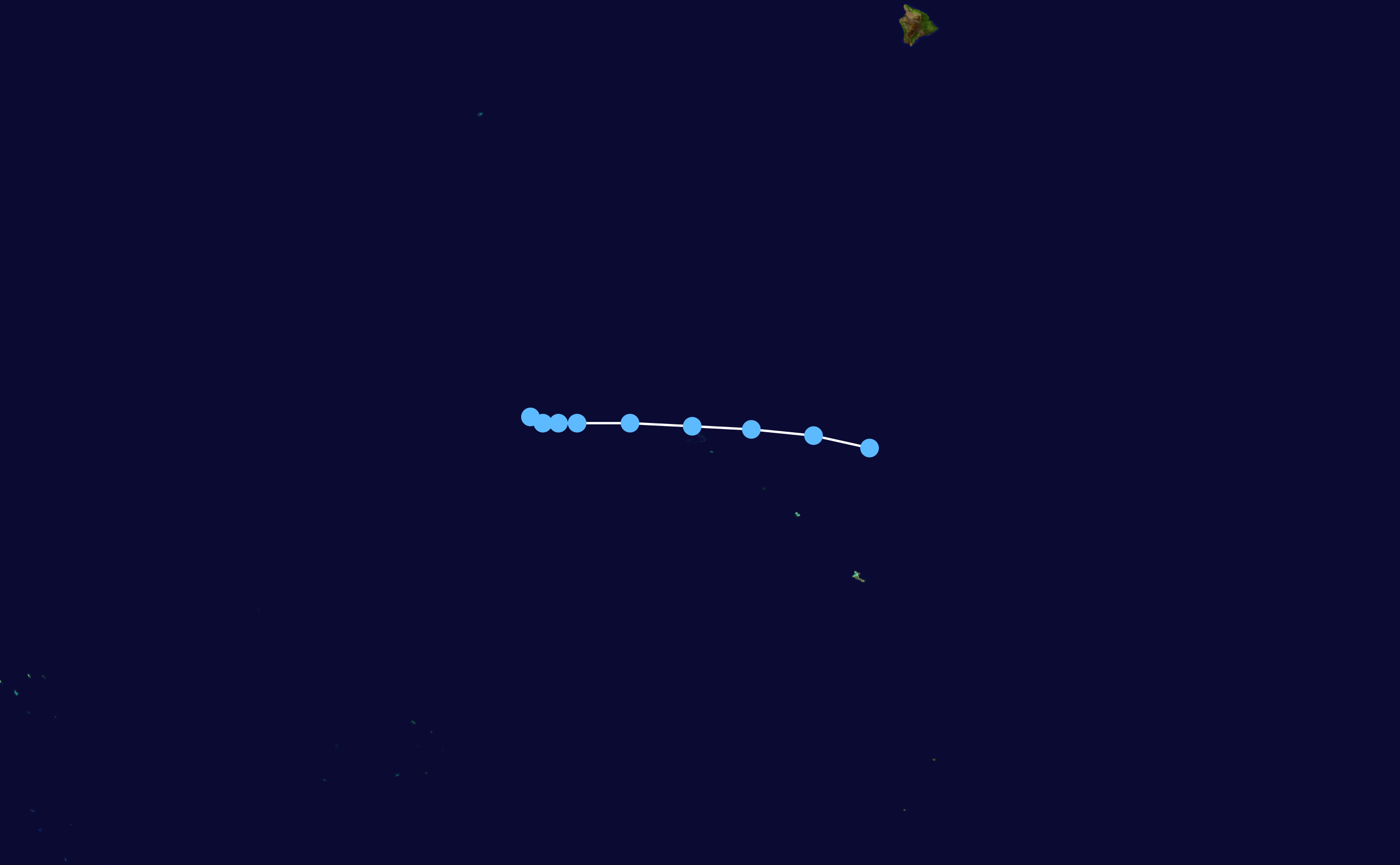
- Duration: July 5 – July 5
- Peak intensity: 30 mph (45 km/h) (1-min); 1007 mbar (hPa)

An organized region of convection within the Intertropical Convergence Zone developed into a tropical depression at 03:00 UTC on July 5 while located roughly 700 mi (1,100 km) south-southeast of Johnston Atoll, becoming the farthest-south-forming central Pacific tropical cyclone since Tropical Storm Hali (1992). Steered westward, the depression failed to intensify due to its quick forward motion despite a seemingly favorable environment, and it quickly dissipated at 00:00 UTC on July 6.

=== Tropical Storm Blas ===
- Tropical storm (SSHWS)
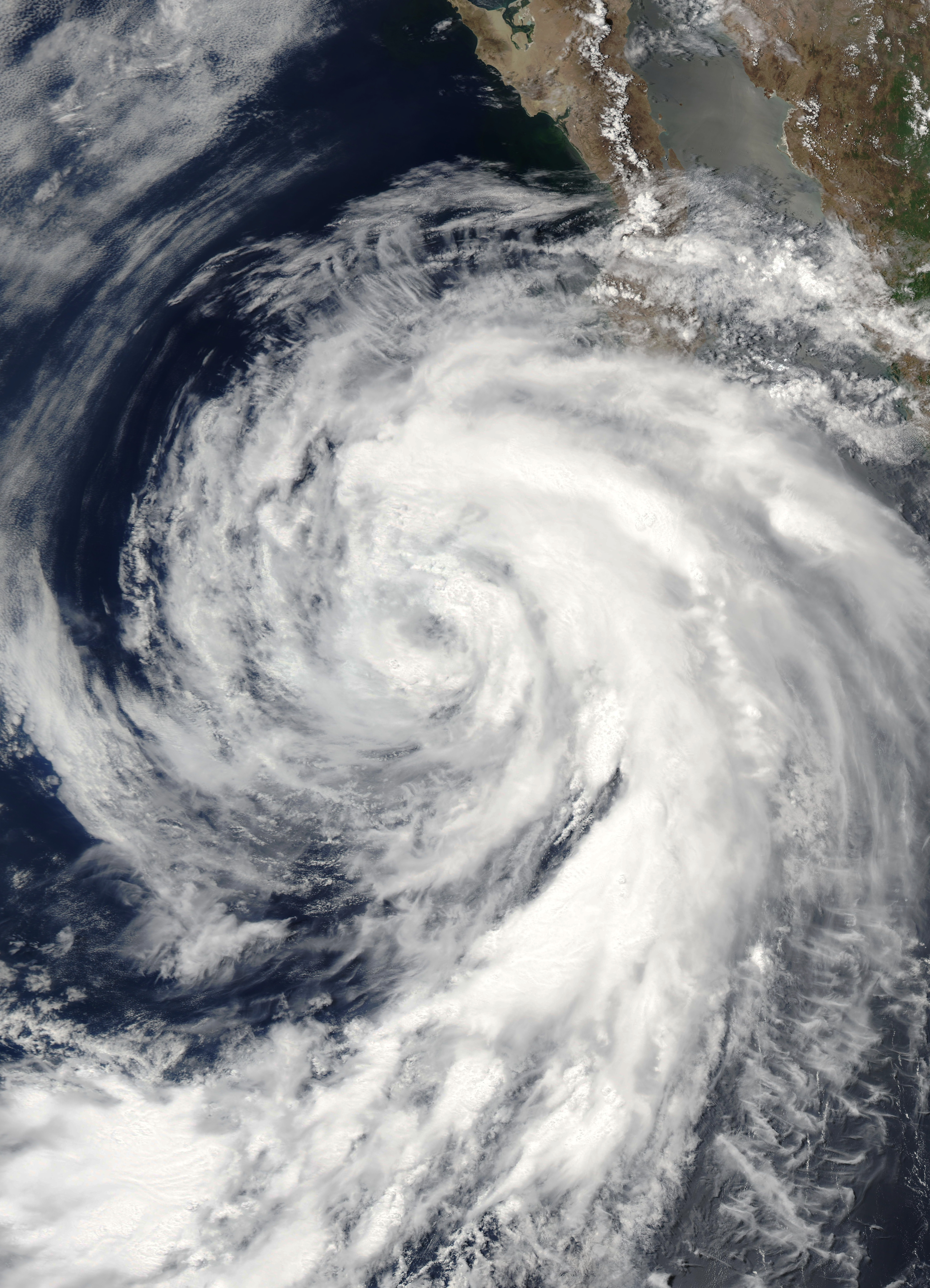
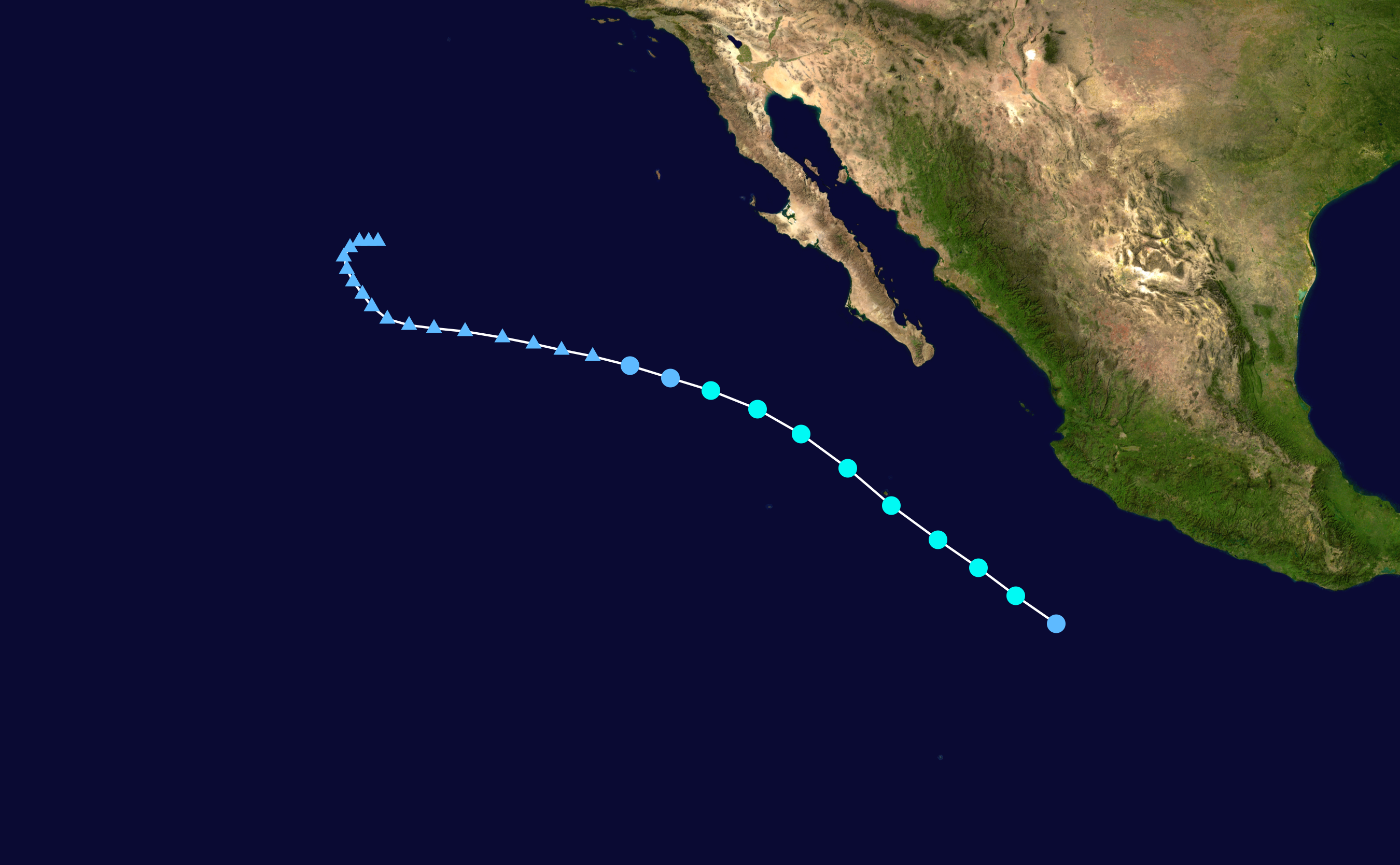
- Duration: July 12 – July 15
- Peak intensity: 65 mph (100 km/h) (1-min); 991 mbar (hPa)

A tropical wave crossed Central America on July 8, developing into a tropical depression at 12:00 UTC on July 12 while located about 335 mi (539 km) southwest of Zihuatanejo, Mexico; six hours later, the depression intensified into Tropical Storm Blas. Steered swiftly northwestward around a mid-level ridge over the southwestern United States, the cyclone steadily intensified and reached peak winds of 65 mph (105 km/h) early on July 13 as a large and robust convective canopy became evident. Blas began a steady weakening trend as it tracked over increasingly cool sea surface temperatures, weakening to a tropical depression at 18:00 UTC on July 14 and degenerating into a large remnant low twelve hours later. The post-tropical cyclone decelerated and curved northeastward, dissipating well west of central Baja California early on July 19.

=== Hurricane Celia ===
- Category 1 hurricane (SSHWS)
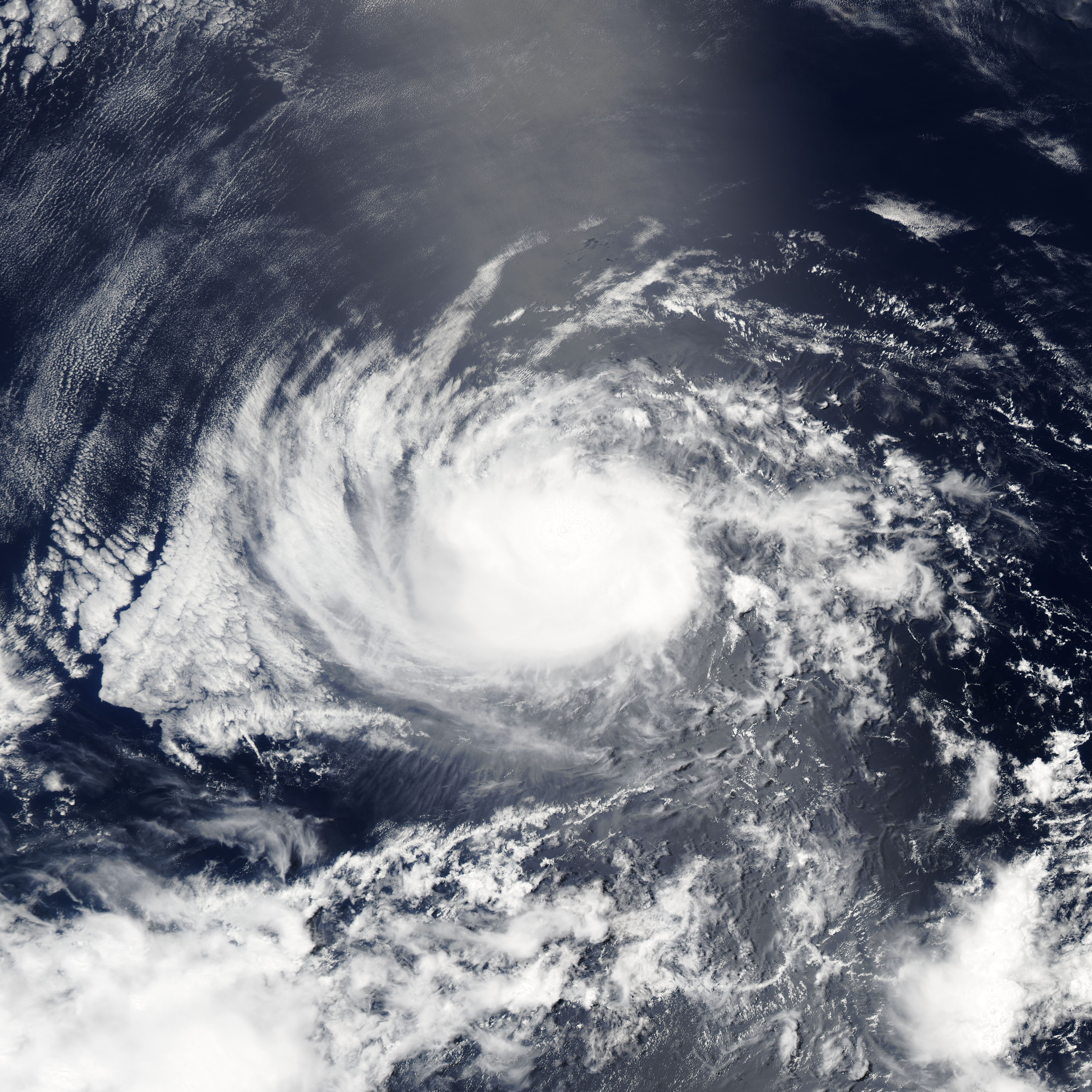
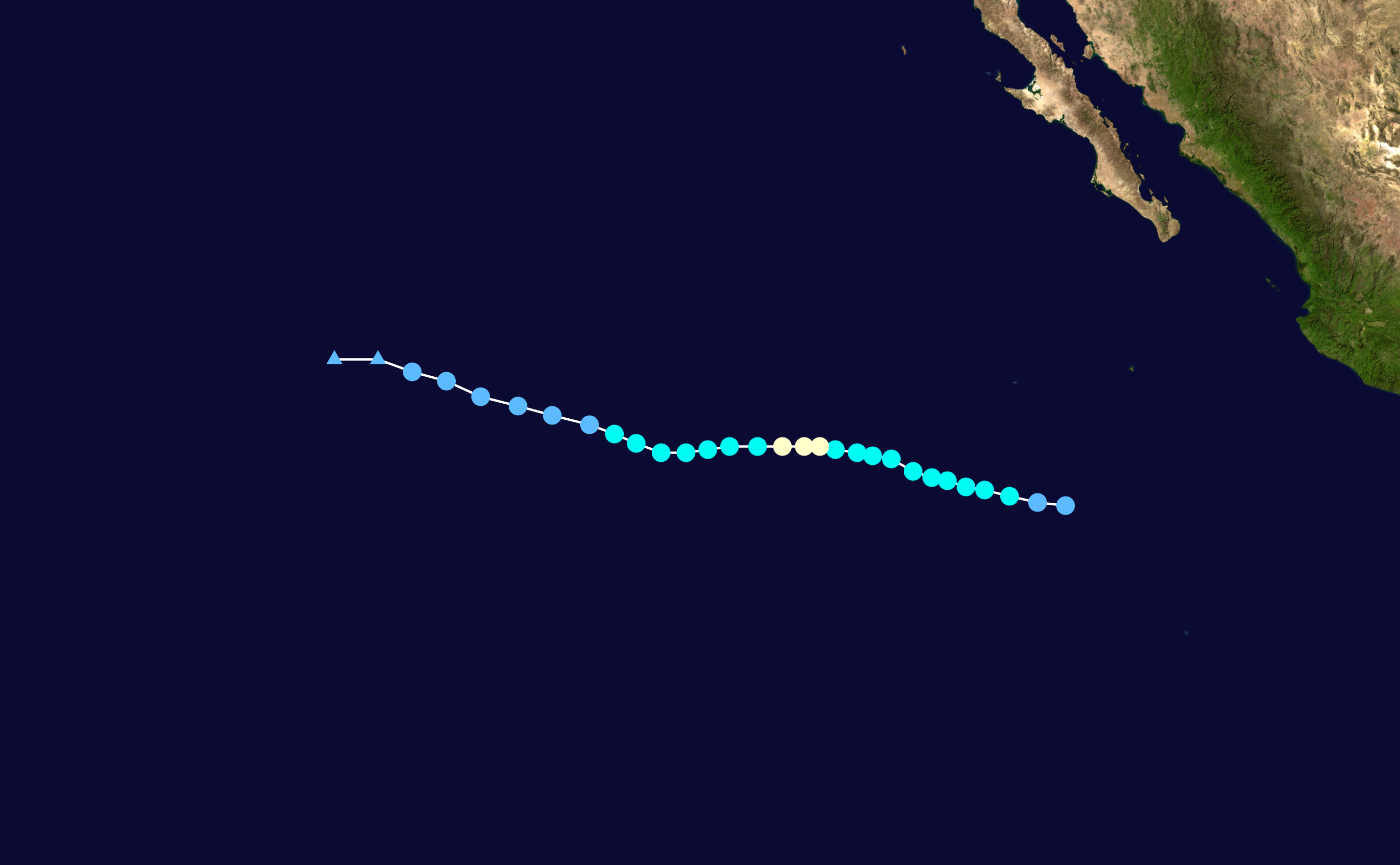
- Duration: July 19 – July 25
- Peak intensity: 85 mph (140 km/h) (1-min); 981 mbar (hPa)

A vigorous tropical wave entered the East Pacific on July 13, acquiring sufficient organization to be declared a tropical depression at 00:00 UTC on July 19 while located about 620 mi (1,000 km) south-southwest of the southern tip of the Baja California Peninsula. Directed west-northwest around a subtropical ridge, the cyclone steadily intensified amongst a favorable environment, becoming Tropical Storm Celia at 12:00 UTC that same day and further strengthening into a Category 1 hurricane on the Saffir–Simpson hurricane wind scale, the season's first, at 00:00 UTC on July 22. After attaining peak winds of 85 mph (137 km/h) six hours later, an increasingly unfavorable environment began to hinder the system. Celia weakened to a tropical storm at 18:00 UTC on July 22 and eventually degenerated into a remnant low at 00:00 UTC on July 26. The post-tropical cyclone dissipated about 1,740 mi (2,800 km) west-southwest of the southern tip of the Baja California Peninsula later that morning.

=== Hurricane Darby ===
- Category 3 hurricane (SSHWS)
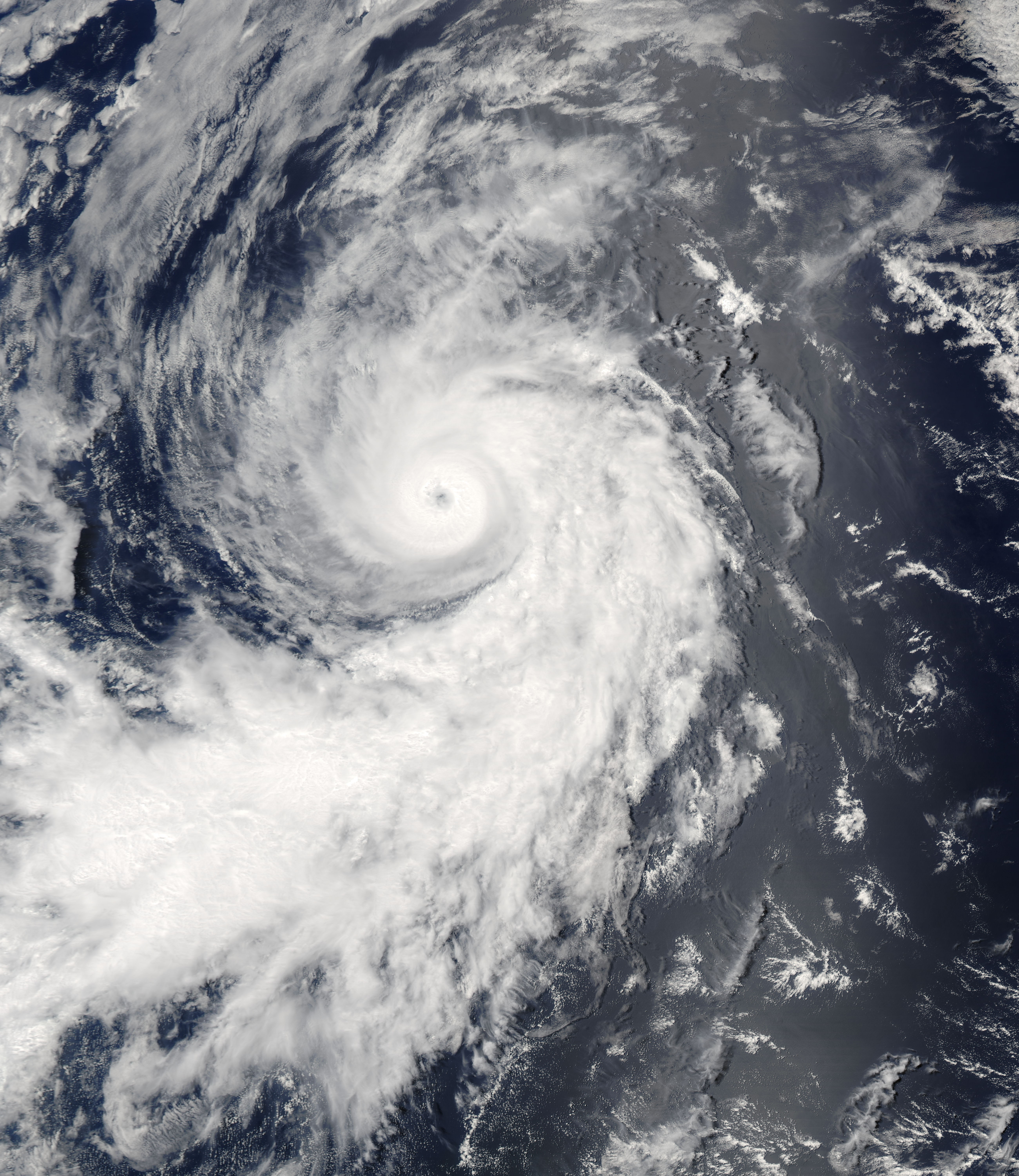
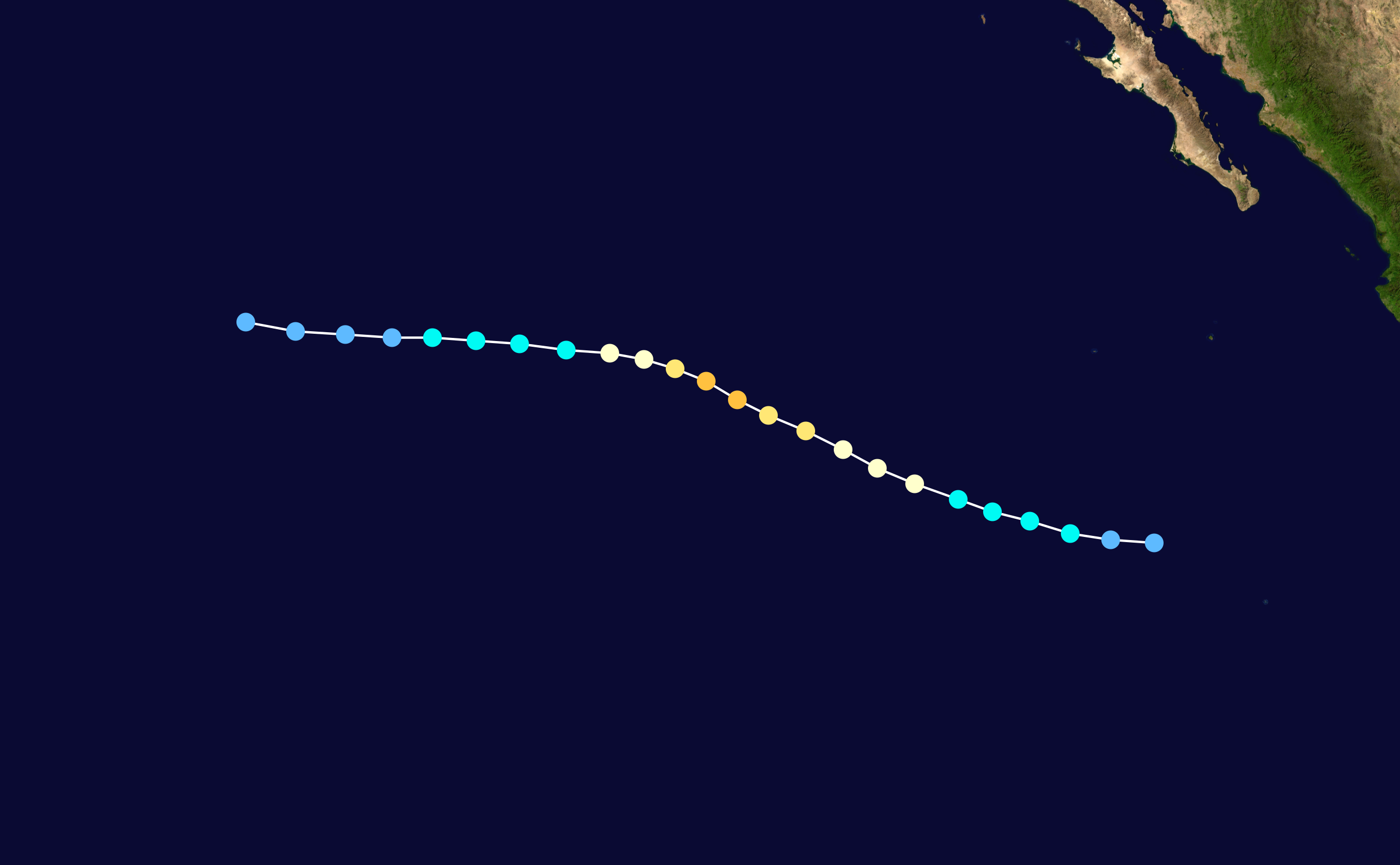
- Duration: July 26 – August 1
- Peak intensity: 120 mph (195 km/h) (1-min); 957 mbar (hPa)

A tropical depression formed at 12:00 UTC on July 26 while positioned about 760 mi (1,220 km) south-southwest of Cabo San Lucas, Mexico from a tropical wave that entered the eastern Pacific nearly a week prior. The system quickly intensified as it curved west-northwest around a subtropical ridge, becoming Tropical Storm Darby at 00:00 UTC on July 27 and strengthening into a Category 1 hurricane early the next day. After attaining its peak as the season's first major hurricane with winds of 120 mph (190 km/h), increasing wind shear and cooler sea surface temperatures begin to weaken the cyclone. It weakened to a tropical storm at 12:00 UTC on July 30 and further to a tropical depression a day later as it entered the jurisdiction of the Central Pacific Hurricane Center. At 12:00 UTC on August 1, Darby dissipated about 850 mi (1,370 km) east of the Hawaiian Islands.

Although Darby produced no impacts to land as a tropical cyclone, its remnant moisture field combined with an upper-level trough over Hawaii to produce an unstable atmosphere. General rainfall amounts of 2–5 in (51–127 mm) were recorded across the Big Island and Oahu, with a localized peak of 9.04 in (230 mm) in Kaneohe; this led to flooding and several road closures. Minor stream flooding was observed on the southeast flank of Mount Haleakalā. A rainfall total of 3.06 in (78 mm) was recorded at the Honolulu International Airport, contributing to the wettest August on record in the city. Some coffee and macadamia nut trees were damaged.

=== Tropical Depression Six-E ===
- Tropical depression (SSHWS)
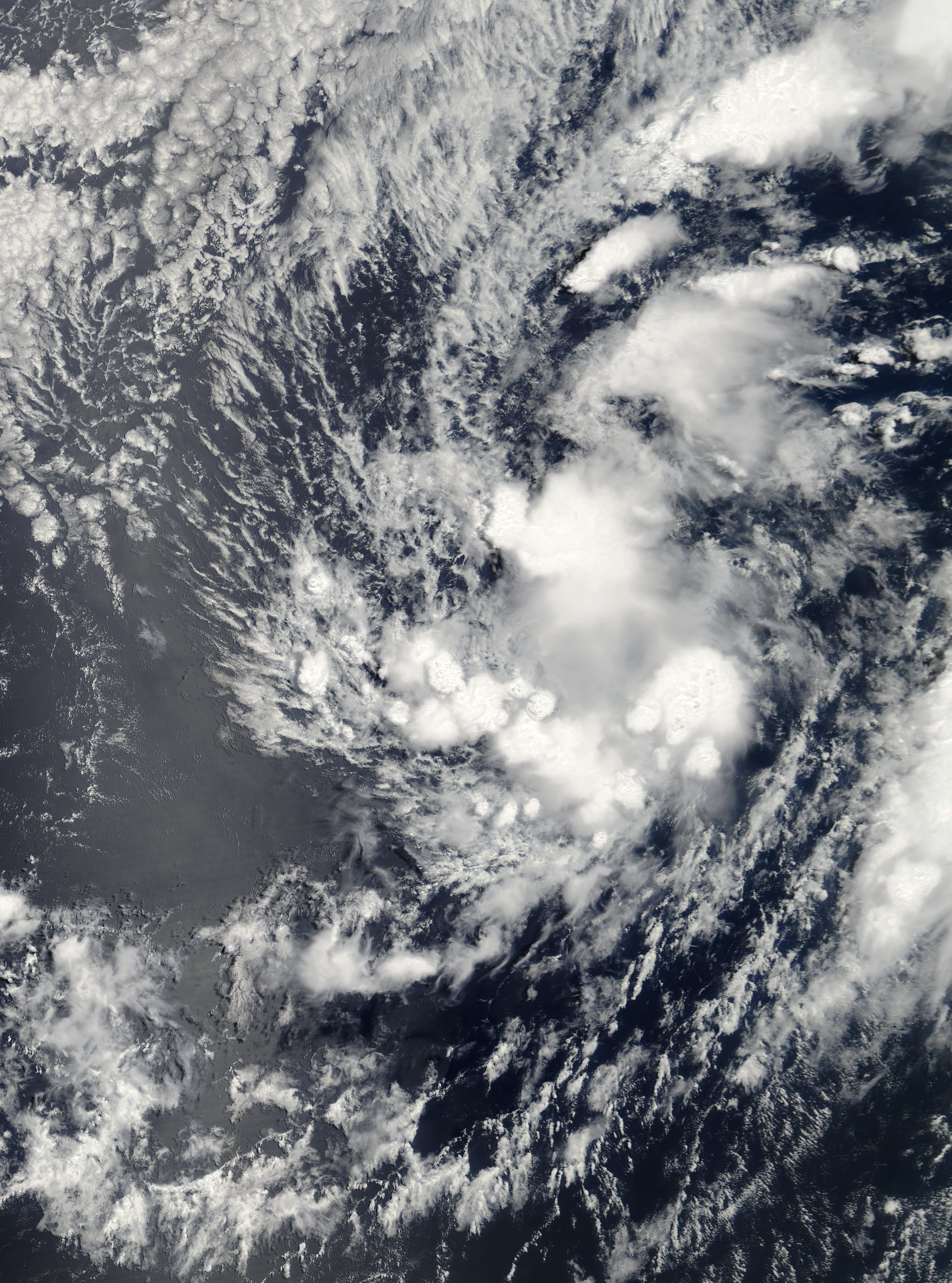
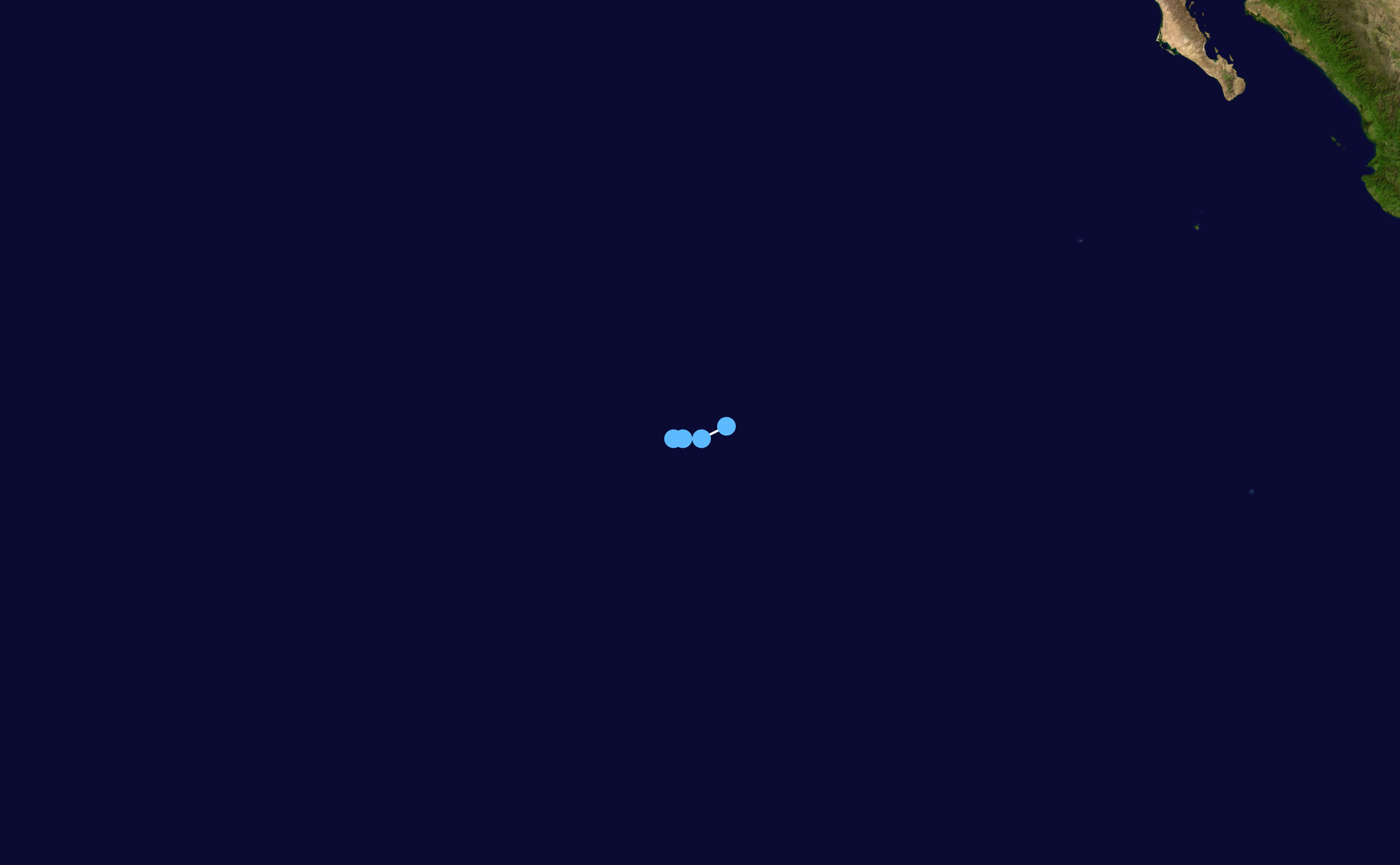
- Duration: August 1 – August 2
- Peak intensity: 30 mph (45 km/h) (1-min); 1008 mbar (hPa)

Operationally, an area of disturbed weather was thought to have coalesced into a tropical depression at 09:00 UTC on July 29 while located well southwest of the Baja California Peninsula. The depression was only expected to intensify slightly before entering cooler waters and interacting with outflow from nearby Hurricane Darby. By late that evening, however, its presentation on satellite imagery more resembled a trough, and the NHC discontinued advisories. In post-season analysis, the organization determined that the depression did not form until 06:00 UTC on August 1 but lasted 24 hours.

=== Tropical Storm Estelle ===
- Tropical storm (SSHWS)
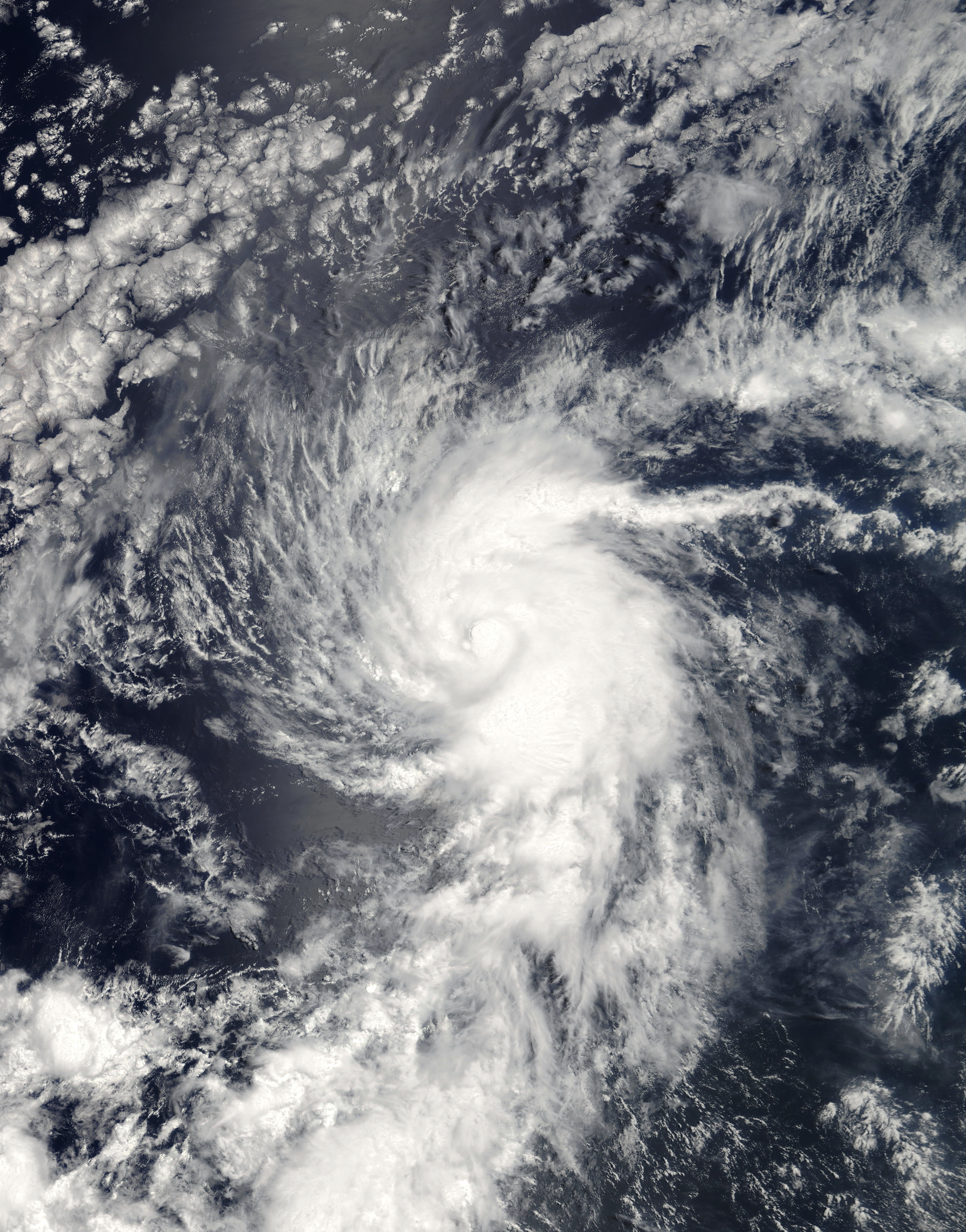
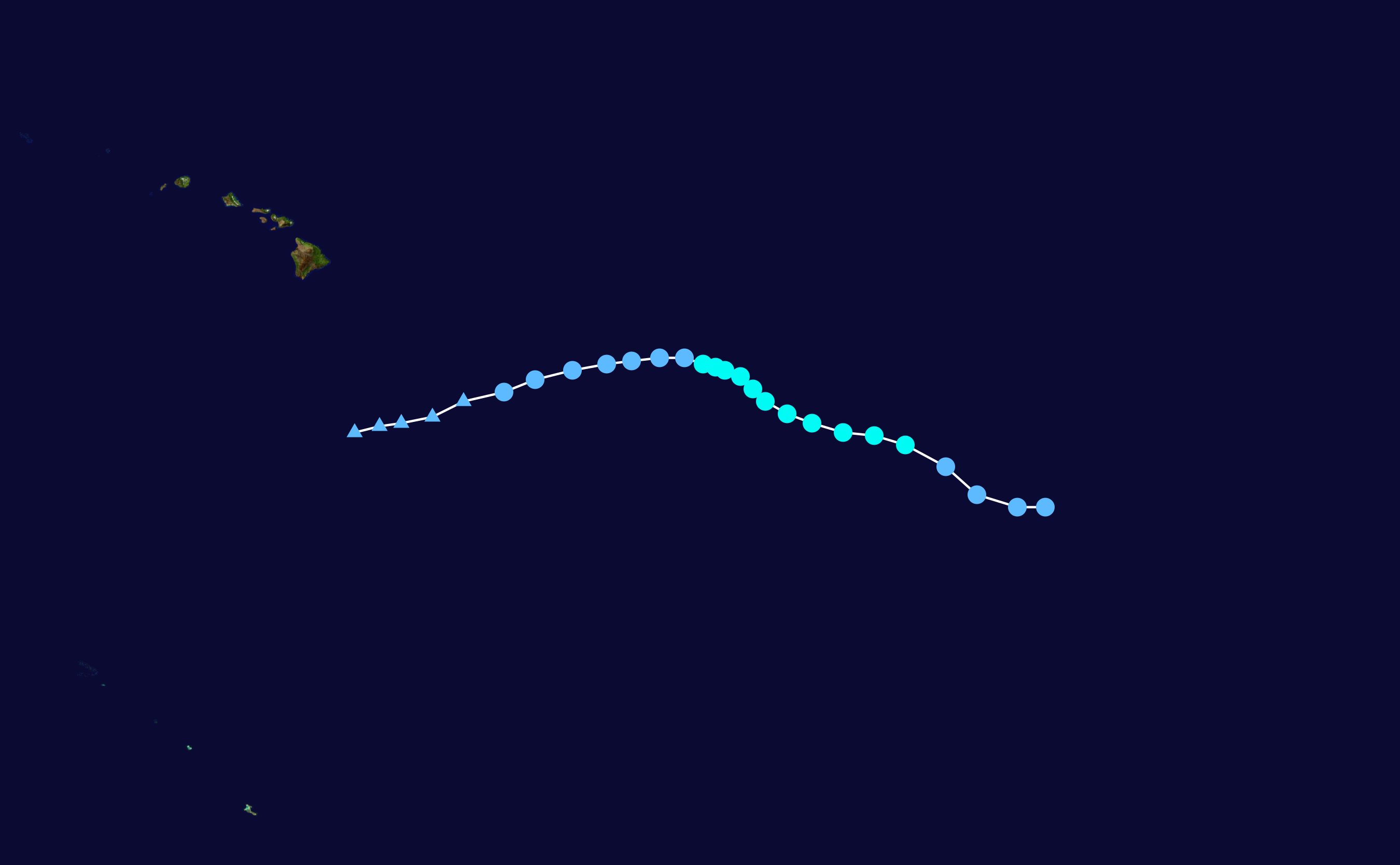
- Duration: August 19 – August 24
- Peak intensity: 70 mph (110 km/h) (1-min); 989 mbar (hPa)

A tropical wave interacted with a disturbance embedded in the ITCZ in mid-August, leading to the designation of a tropical depression at 06:00 UTC on August 19 while located 1,440 mi (2,320 km) east-southeast of Hilo, Hawaii. The cyclone moved west-northwest following formation, steered around a subtropical ridge. It intensified into Tropical Storm Estelle at 06:00 UTC on August 20 and attained peak winds of 70 mph (110 km/h) at 12:00 UTC the next morning as it crossed into the central Pacific. Thereafter, increasing wind shear caused Estelle to a steady weakening trend. At 00:00 UTC on August 23, the cyclone decelerated to a tropical depression while turning west-southwest, and at 18:00 UTC the following day, it further degenerated into a remnant low. The post-tropical cyclone continued on a west-southwest trajectory prior to dissipating south-southeast of the Big Island at 00:00 UTC on August 26.

=== Hurricane Frank ===
- Category 1 hurricane (SSHWS)
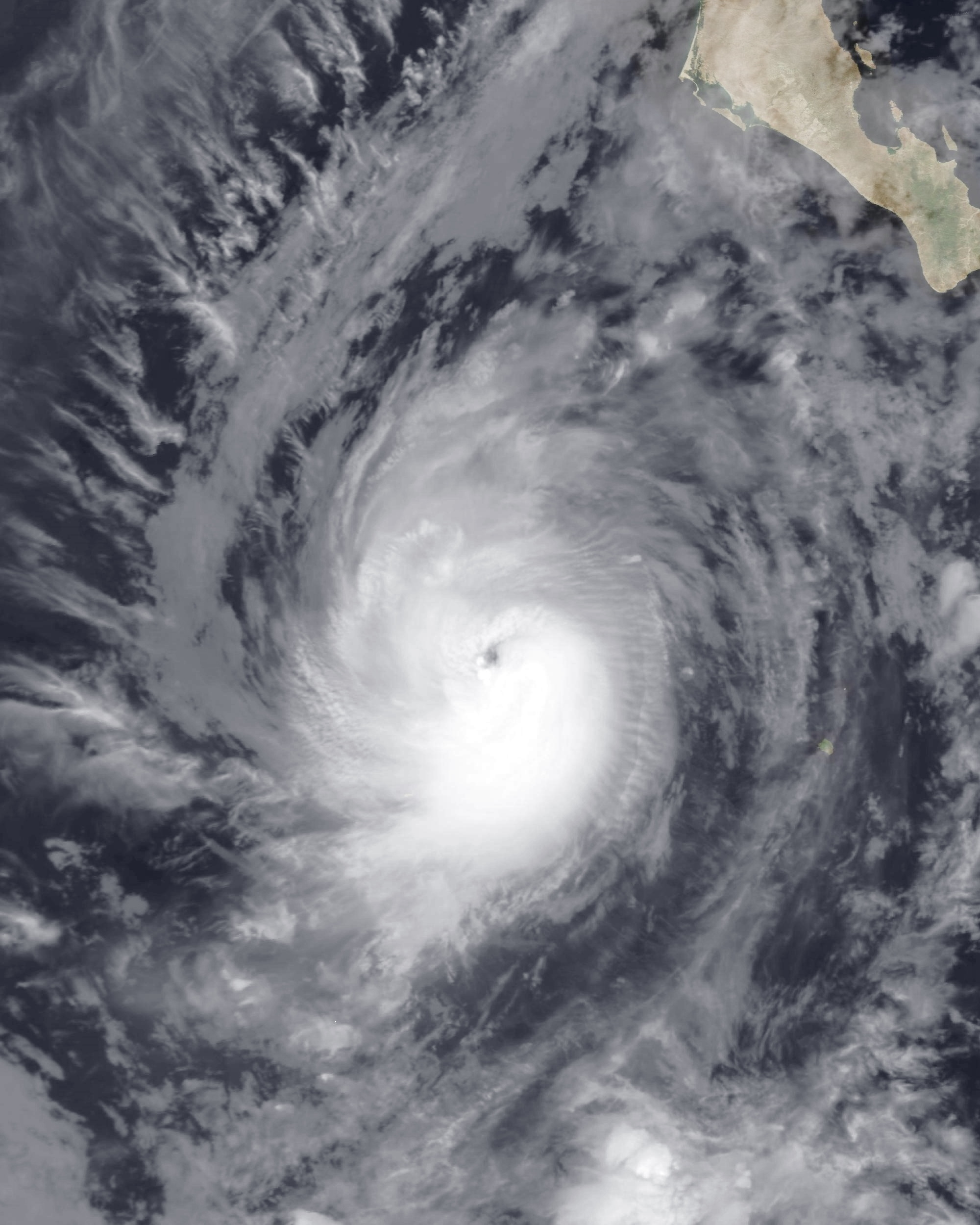
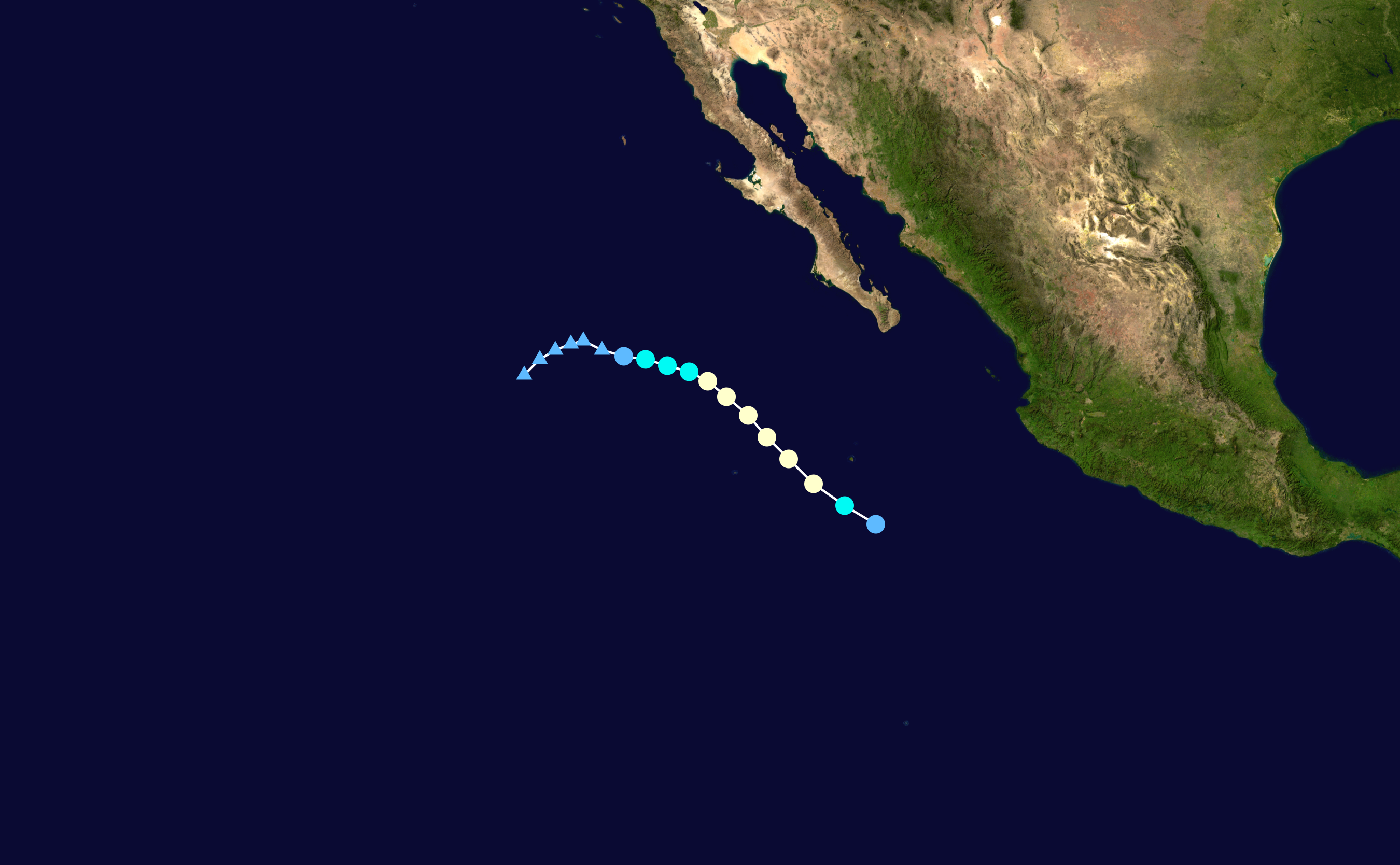
- Duration: August 23 – August 26
- Peak intensity: 85 mph (140 km/h) (1-min); 979 mbar (hPa)

A tropical wave, the remnants of Tropical Storm Earl in the Atlantic, crossed into the eastern Pacific in mid-August and steadily organized to become a tropical depression at 06:00 UTC on August 23 well south of the coastline of Mexico. The depression intensified into Tropical Storm Frank six hours later as banding features and central convection increased. Steered northwest within a favorable environment, the cyclone rapidly intensified into a Category 1 hurricane by 18:00 UTC and ultimately attained peak winds of 85 mph (137 km/h) twelve hours later. Frank steadily weakened thereafter as it entered cooler ocean temperatures, degenerating into a remnant low at 06:00 UTC on August 26. The remnant low drifted southwest before diffusing into a trough well south of the Baja California Peninsula the following day.

=== Tropical Depression Nine-E ===
- Tropical depression (SSHWS)
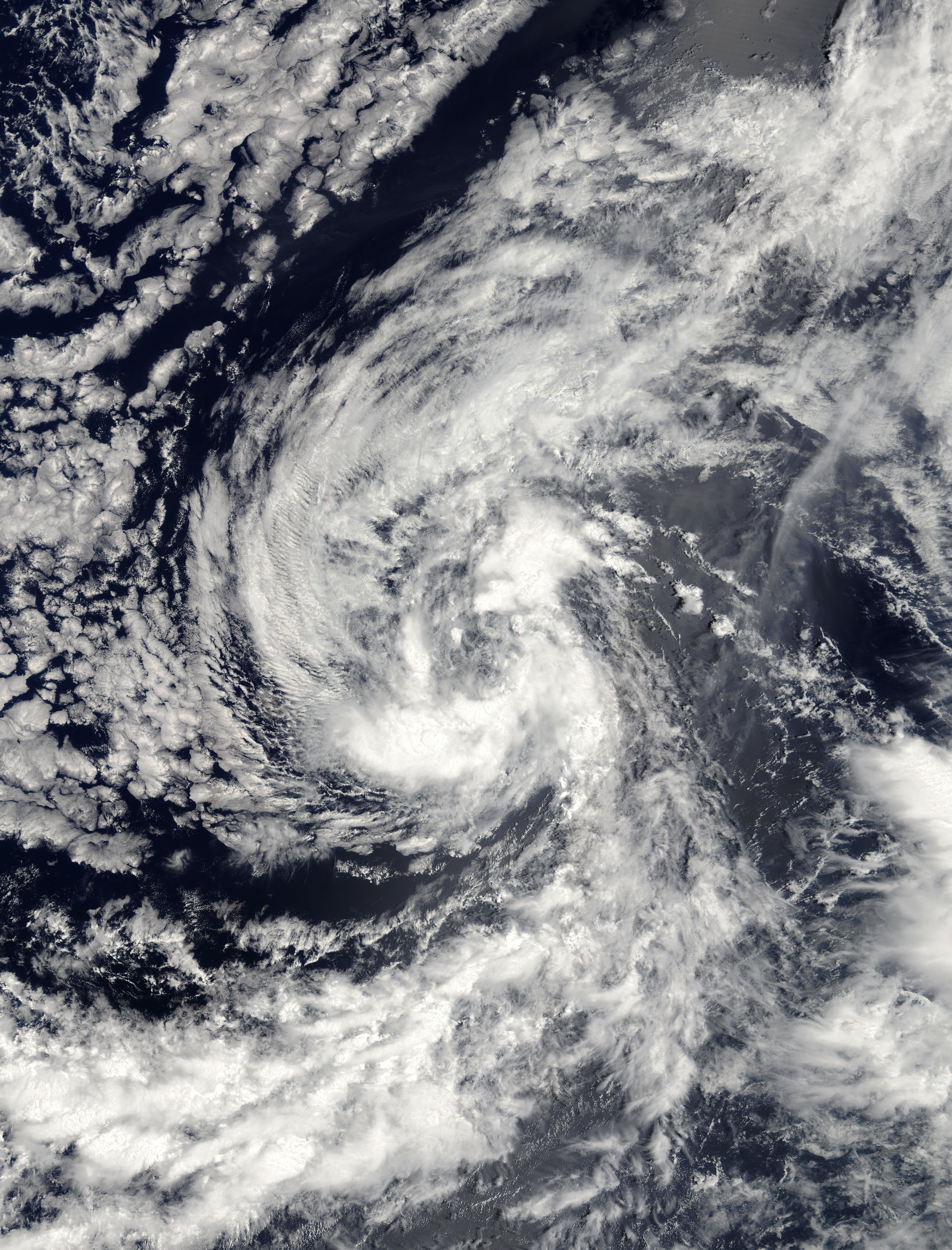
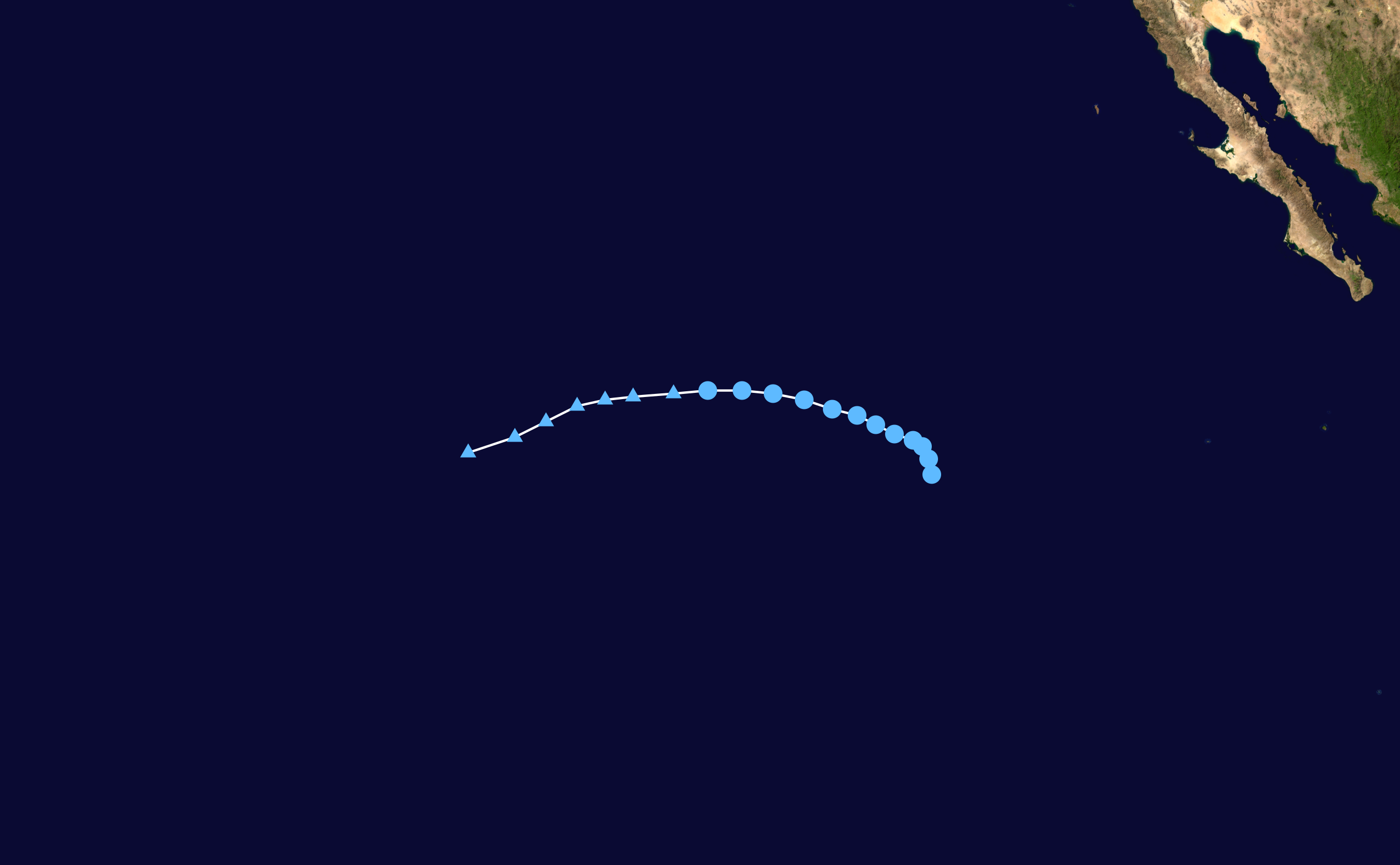
- Duration: August 23 – August 26
- Peak intensity: 35 mph (55 km/h) (1-min); 1005 mbar (hPa)

A tropical wave crossed Central America on August 15, only slowing organizing into a tropical depression at 18:00 UTC on August 23 while located about 920 mi (1,480 km) west-southwest of Cabo San Lucas, Mexico. Steered north-northwest and eventually west, the cyclone failed to intensify further into a tropical storm amid cool sea surface temperatures and southerly wind shear, and it instead degenerated into a remnant low at 18:00 UTC on August 26. The post-tropical cyclone turned west-southwest before dissipating about 1,095 mi (1,762 km) east of Hilo, Hawaii early on August 28.

=== Tropical Storm Georgette ===
- Tropical storm (SSHWS)
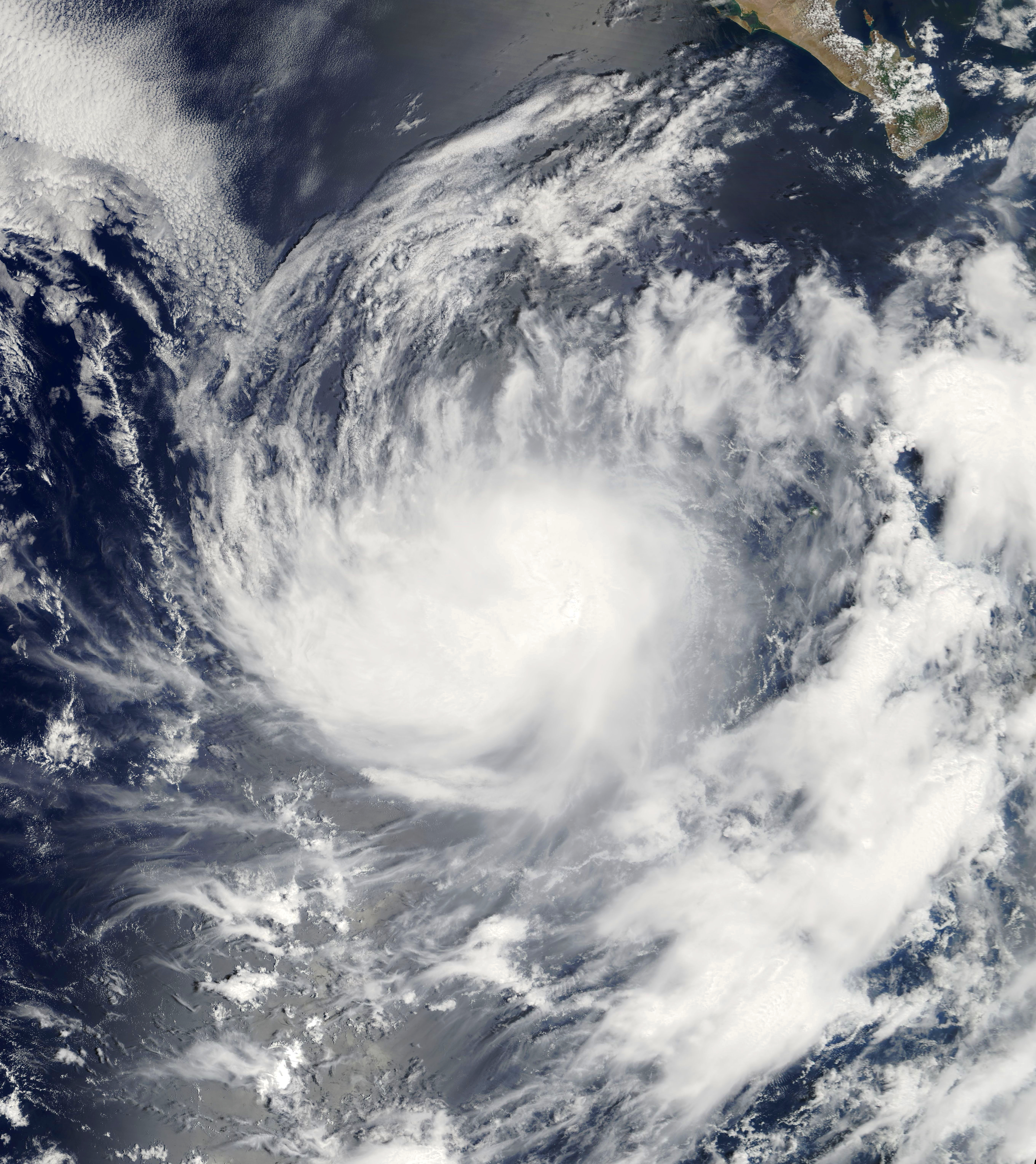
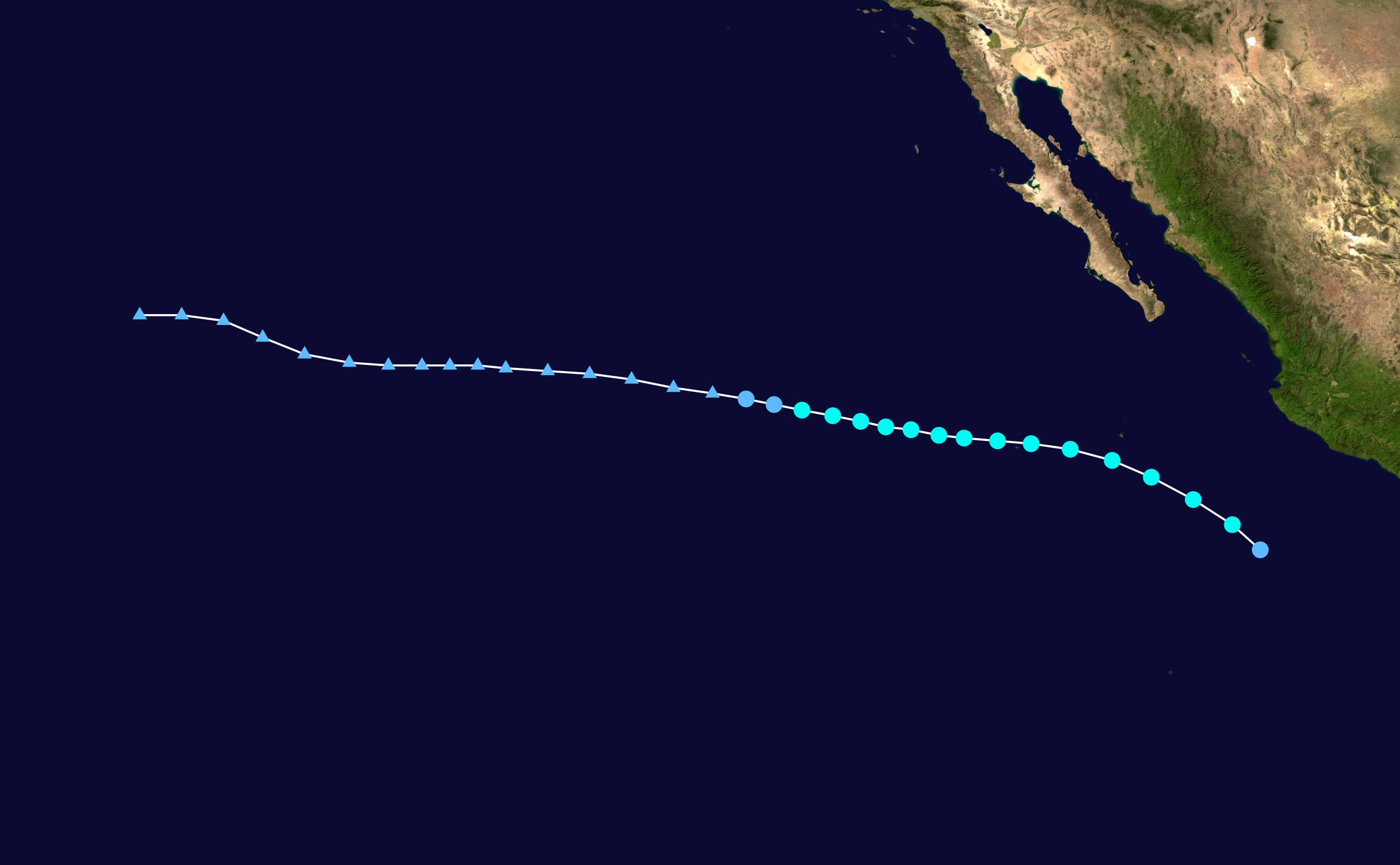
- Duration: August 26 – August 30
- Peak intensity: 65 mph (100 km/h) (1-min); 995 mbar (hPa)

A westward-moving tropical wave entered the eastern Pacific in late August, acquiring sufficient organization to be declared a tropical depression at 12:00 UTC on August 26 about 605 miles (974 km) south-southeast of the Baja California Peninsula. The depression intensified into Tropical Storm Georgette six hours later as its satellite presentation improved, and it reached peak winds of 65 mph (105 km/h) at 12:00 UTC on August 27. Increasingly hostile upper-level winds began to impinge on the west-northwest-moving tropical cyclone shortly thereafter, ultimately causing it to degenerate into a remnant low by 18:00 UTC on August 30. The post-tropical cyclone continued its forward course until dissipating early on September 3.

=== Hurricane Howard ===
- Category 4 hurricane (SSHWS)
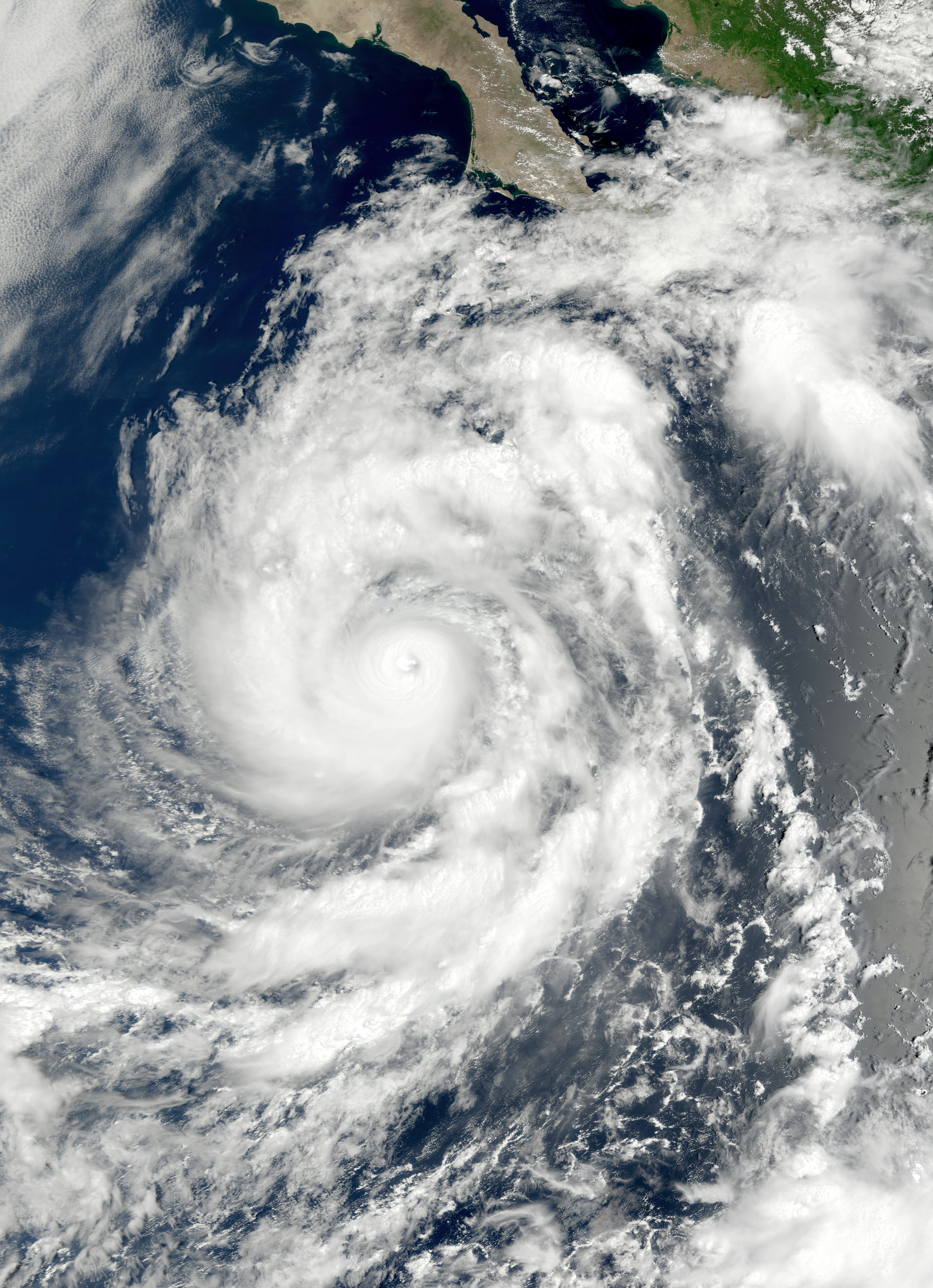
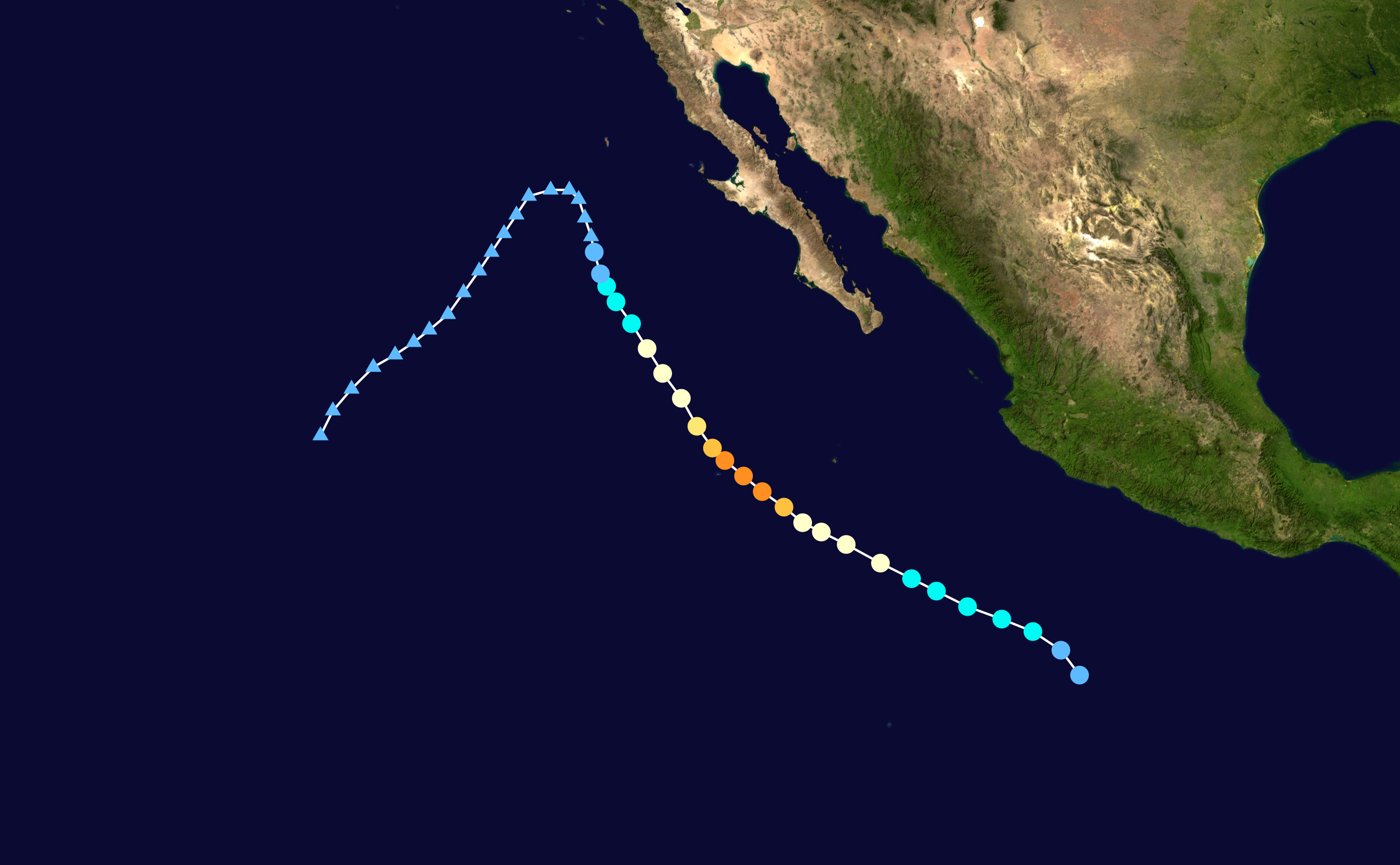
- Duration: August 30 – September 5
- Peak intensity: 140 mph (220 km/h) (1-min); 943 mbar (hPa)

A tropical wave exited west Africa on August 18, reaching the eastern Pacific eight days later. Moving parallel to Mexico's southern coast, the wave spawned Tropical Depression Eleven-E on August 30 about 400 mi (645 km) south-southwest of Acapulco. Amid warm waters and low wind shear, the depression strengthened into Tropical Storm Howard on August 31. Steered by a ridge, the storm moved to the northwest. Early on September 1, Howard attained hurricane status, as a pinhole eye developed, surrounded by a ring of symmetric, deep convection. On September 2, Howard became a major hurricane, reaching maximum sustained winds of 140 mph (220 km/h), which made it a Category 4 hurricane. At the time, it was located 410 mi (660 km) south-southwest of the southern tip of Baja California Sur. Soon after peaking, Howard moved over cooler waters, causing the eye to dissipate and for the convection to deteriorate. This led to rapid weakening, and Howard fell to tropical storm status on September 4. That day, the thunderstorms separated from the circulation. Early on September 5, Howard weakened into a tropical depression, and later that day deteriorated into a remnant low. At that time, it was located about 265 mi (425 km) west-southwest of Punta Eugenia, Mexico. After moving northwest at first, the remnants turned to the southwest on September 6, steered by a ridge. The remnant low dissipated on September 10.

Along the Baja California Peninsula, 16–18 ft (4.8–5.4 m) swells were reported. All ships were required to remain at port due to the rough seas. Heavy rains in the mountainous and Pacific coastal areas of Baja California produced flooding which washed out several roads in San José del Cabo. The rains did help increase water levels in some reservoirs in Baja California. An estimated 2,000 hectares of agricultural land was damaged by the storm and 48 households were damaged throughout four communities. State and federal authorities purchased temporary homes for those who needed shelter in the affected areas. The State Civil Protection in Mexico provided rehabilitation for a total of 393 homes affected by Howard. Large swells produced by the storm resulted in about 1,000 lifeguard rescues in Orange County, California. High temperatures in southern California, exceeding 100 °F (37.7 °C) in places, and cool ocean temperatures led to an estimated 575,000 people going to beaches during the Labor Day weekend. One incident required 25 rescues as dozens of people were overwhelmed by 8–10 ft (2.4–3 m) waves. Moisture from the storm led to light rainfall across portions of Arizona.

=== Hurricane Isis ===
- Category 1 hurricane (SSHWS)
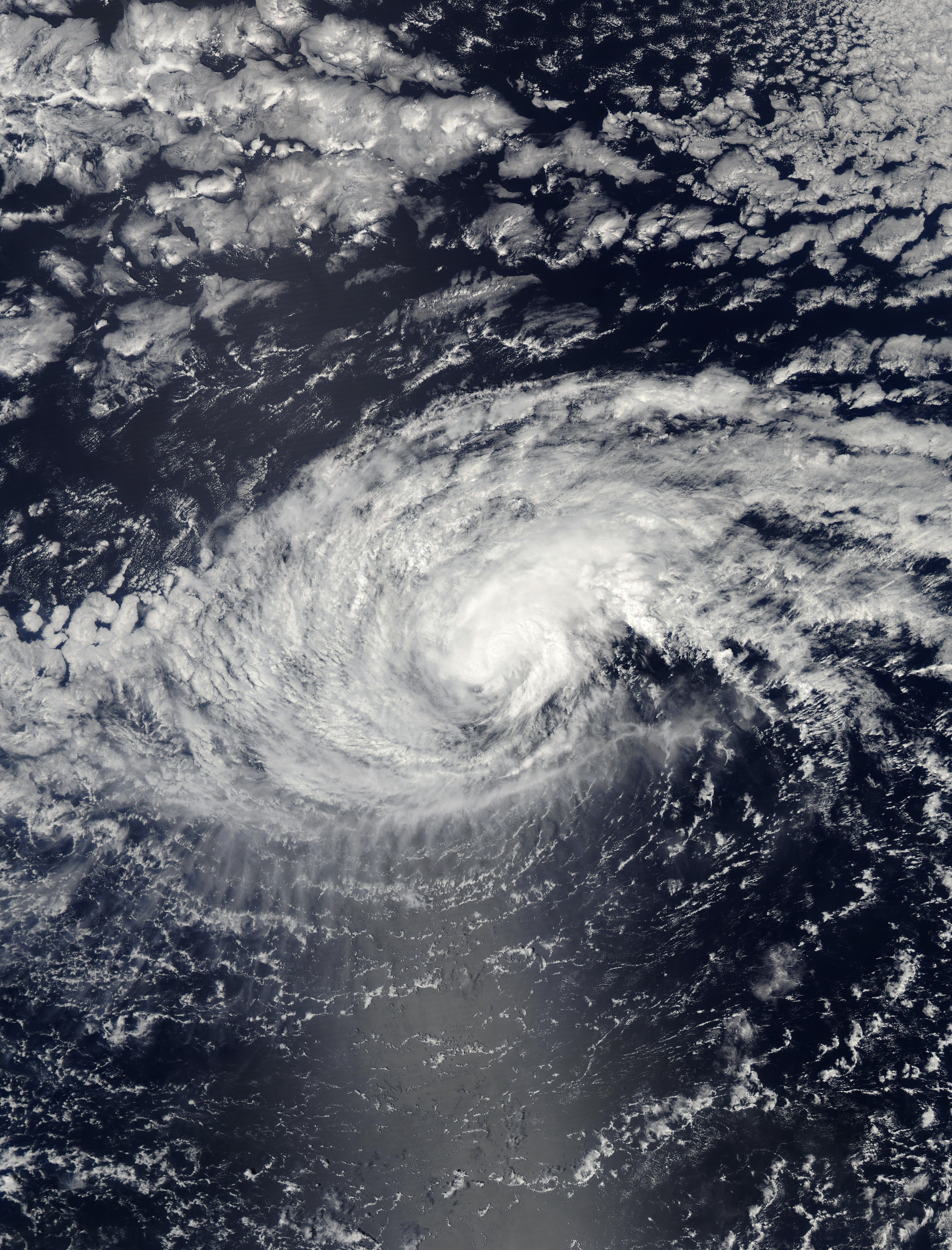
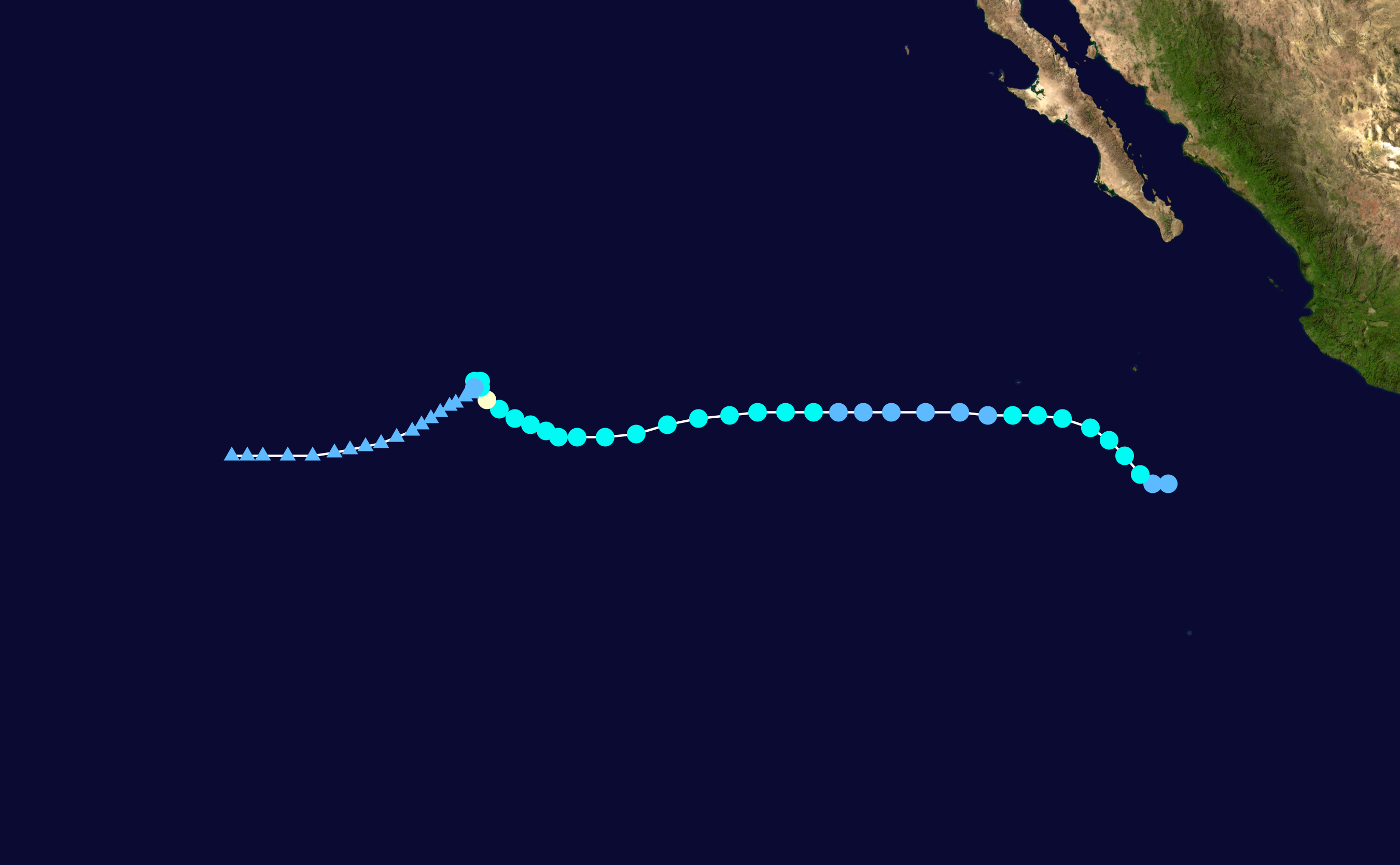
- Duration: September 8 – September 16
- Peak intensity: 75 mph (120 km/h) (1-min); 987 mbar (hPa)

A tropical wave, possibly responsible for the formation of Hurricane Frances in the Atlantic, entered the eastern Pacific in early September, gaining sufficient organization to be declared a tropical depression at 06:00 UTC on September 8 about 530 miles (850 km) south of Cabo San Lucas, Mexico. The system tracked west, intensifying into Tropical Storm Isis twelve hours after being designated, but weakening back to a tropical depression early on September 10, amid persistent wind shear. Upper-level winds decreased by September 12, allowing Isis to regain tropical storm intensity by 00:00 UTC, and eventually peak as a Category 1 hurricane with winds of 75 mph (121 km/h), at 12:00 UTC on September 15. After conducting a clockwise loop, the hurricane entered cooler waters and began to weaken; it degenerated into a remnant low at 18:00 UTC on the next day. The low drifted southwest and then west, before dissipating well east of Hawaii on September 21.

=== Hurricane Javier ===
- Category 4 hurricane (SSHWS)
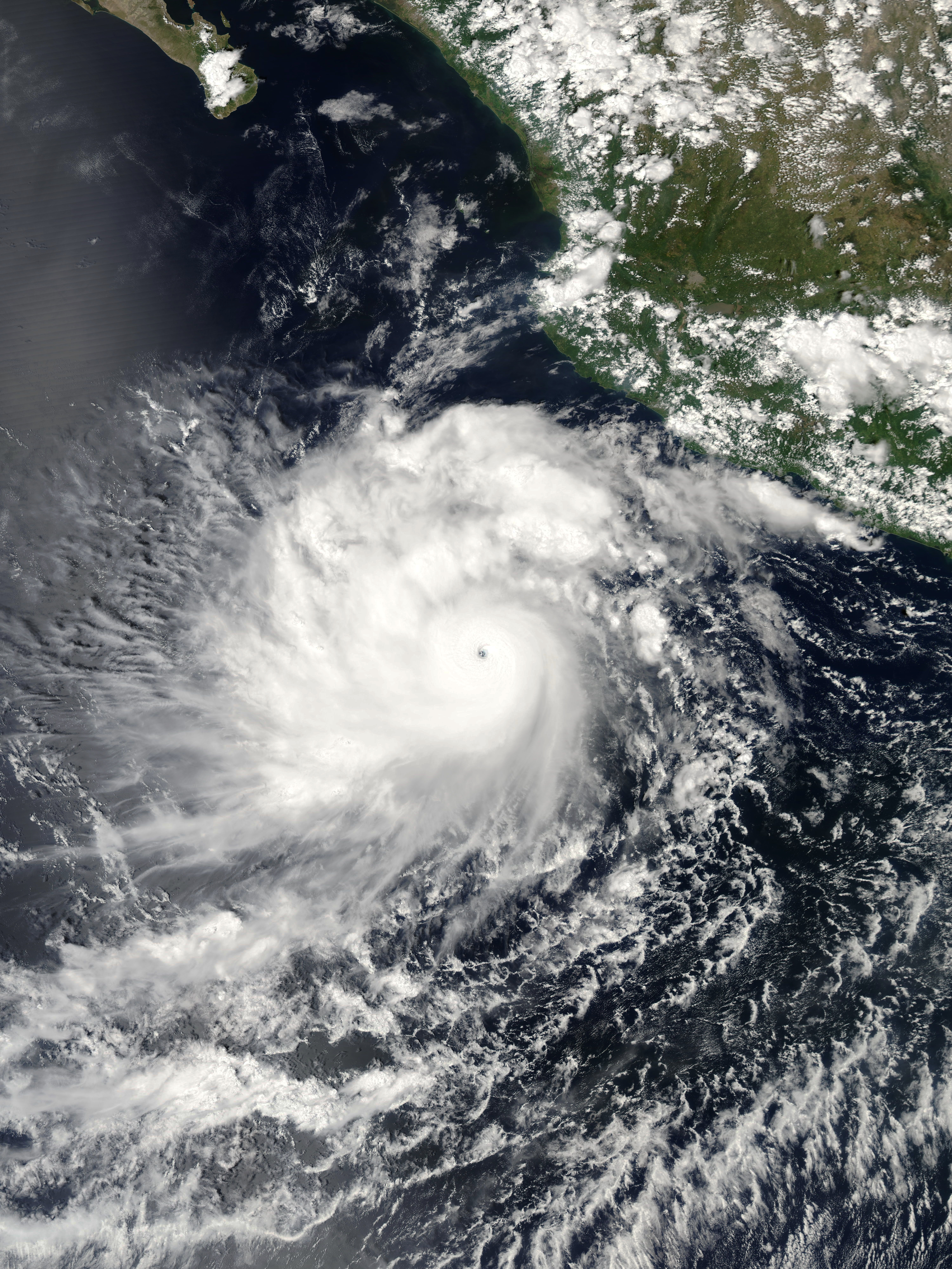
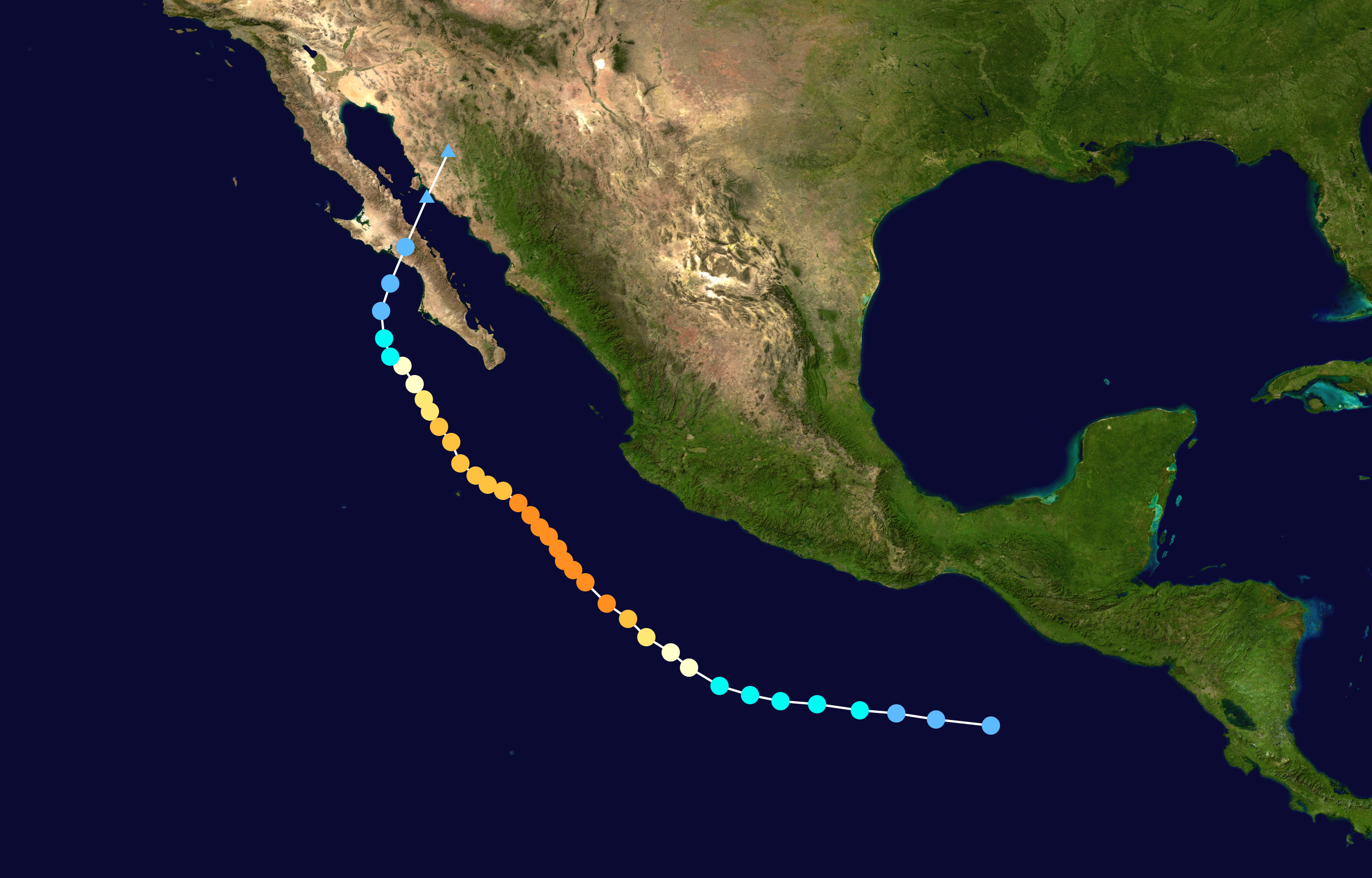
- Duration: September 10 – September 19
- Peak intensity: 150 mph (240 km/h) (1-min); 930 mbar (hPa)

A tropical wave entered the eastern Pacific in early September, organizing into a tropical depression at 18:00 UTC on September 10 south of the Gulf of Tehuantepec. Under light shear, the depression intensified into Tropical Storm Javier at 12:00 UTC the next morning and into a hurricane at 18:00 UTC on September 12. The cyclone soon began a period of rapid intensification as it alternated on a west-northwest to northwest course, ultimately peaking as a Category 4 hurricane with winds of 150 mph (240 km/h) at 00:00 UTC on September 14 as a distinct pinhole eye became evident on satellite imagery. Cooler waters, strong southwesterly shear, and an eyewall replacement cycle all weakened Javier thereafter; it fell to tropical depression intensity early on September 19 before crossing Baja California and degenerated into a remnant low at 18:00 UTC that day over the Gulf of California. The low crossed the state of Sonora before dissipating over mountainous terrain on September 20.

As a tropical cyclone, Javier produced moderate rainfall peaking at 3.14 in (80 mm) in Bacanuchi, Mexico. Three fishermen went missing offshore the coastline due to high surf. As a post-tropical cyclone, the storm's remnant moisture overspread the Southwest United States, alleviating a multi-year drought. Accumulations peaked at 7 in (180 mm) in Walnut Creek, Arizona, with lighter totals across the Four Corners and upper Midwest. The remnants of Javier produced 2 in (51 mm) of rain in Wyoming, cementing its status as the wettest tropical cyclone in the reliable record there.

=== Tropical Storm Kay ===
- Tropical storm (SSHWS)
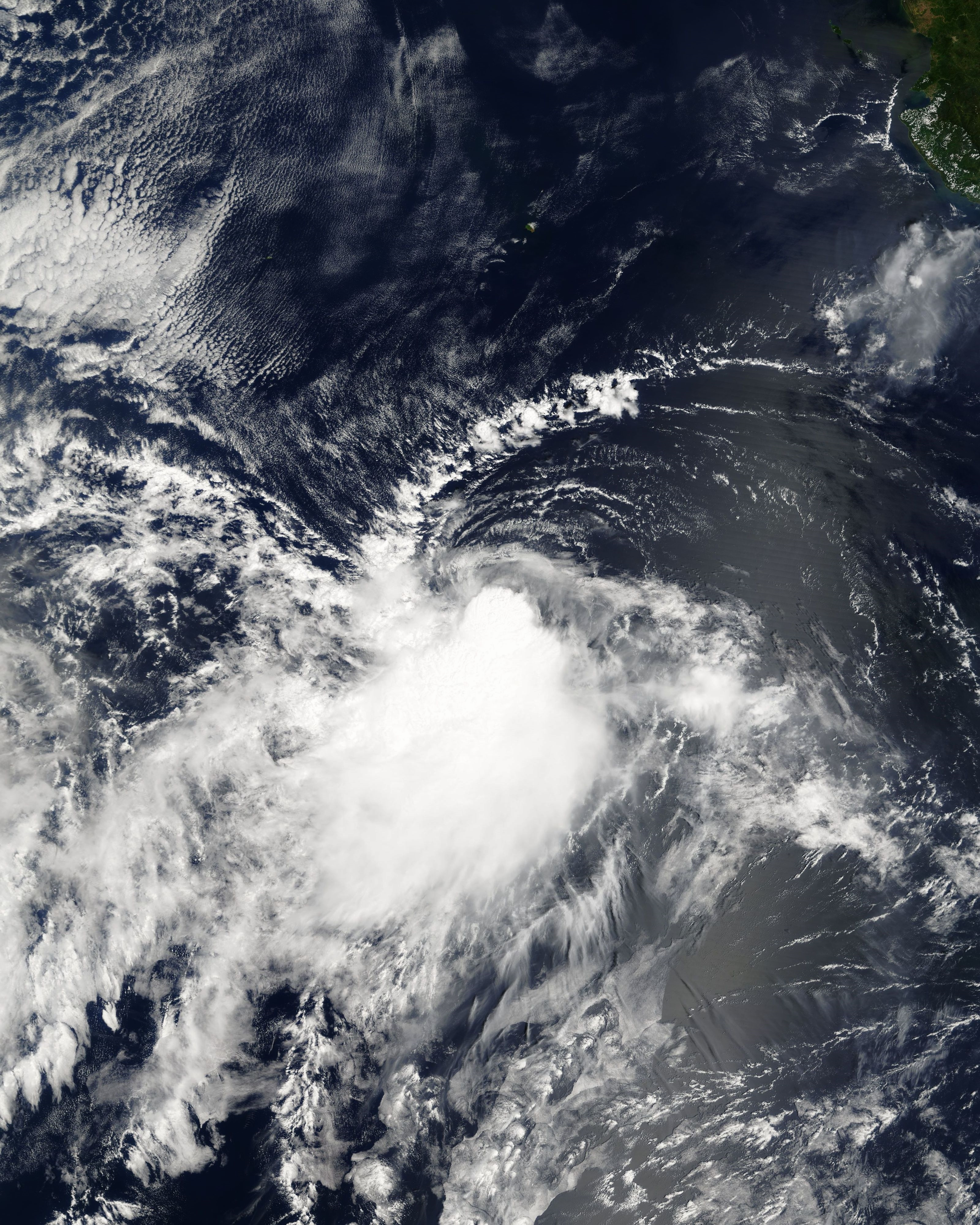
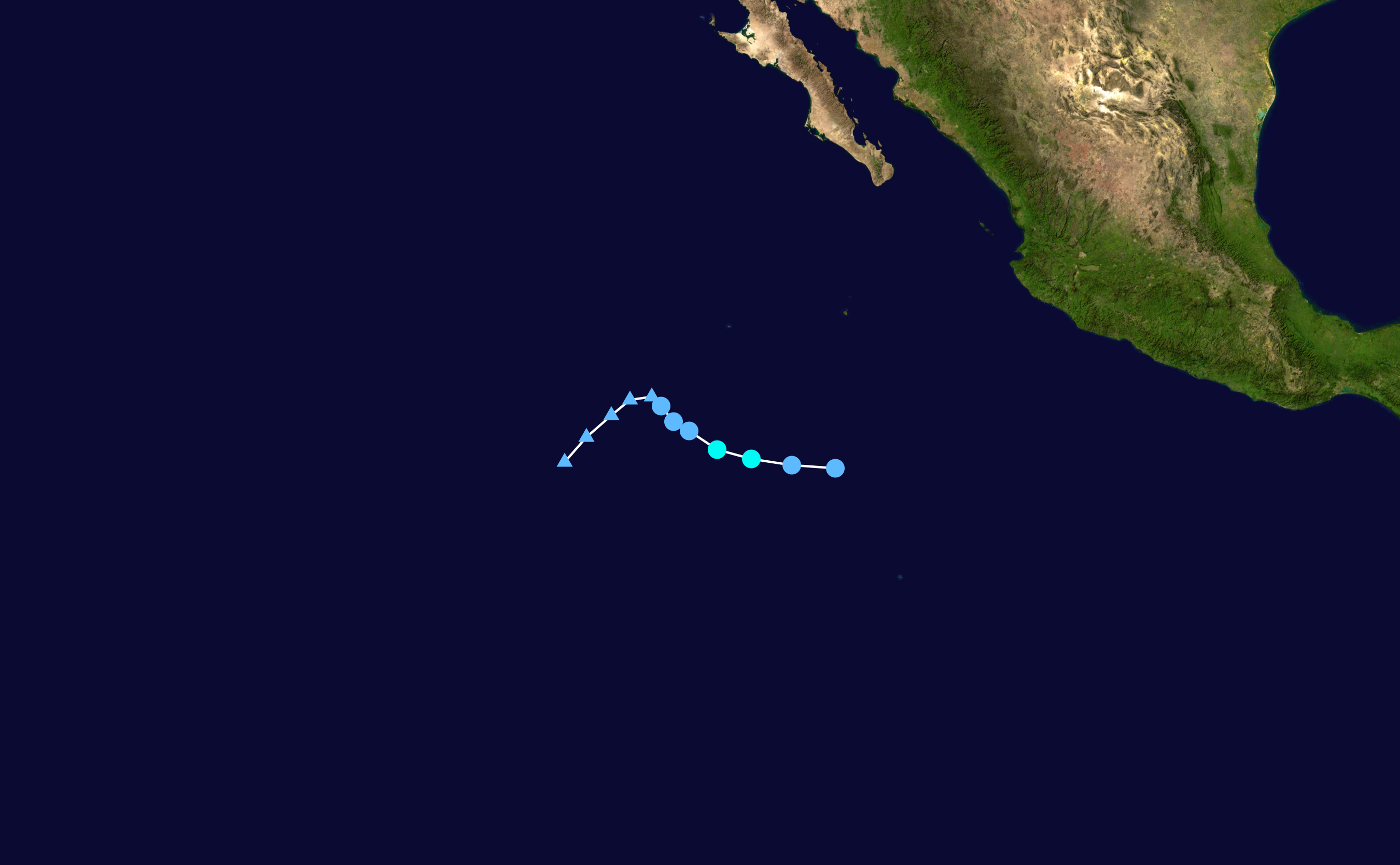
- Duration: October 4 – October 6
- Peak intensity: 45 mph (75 km/h) (1-min); 1004 mbar (hPa)

An area of disturbed weather developed within the ITCZ well southwest of mainland Mexico, coalescing into a tropical depression at 18:00 UTC on October 4. The depression strengthened into Tropical Storm Kay twelve hours later, and it attained peak winds of 45 mph (72 km/h) at 12:00 UTC the next morning as suggested by satellite intensity estimates. Moderate northerly shear caused core convection to decrease as the system moved west-northwest, resulting in Kay degenerating into a remnant low at 12:00 UTC on October 6 over open ocean. The low-level swirl curved southwestward and dissipated the next day.

=== Tropical Storm Lester ===
- Tropical storm (SSHWS)
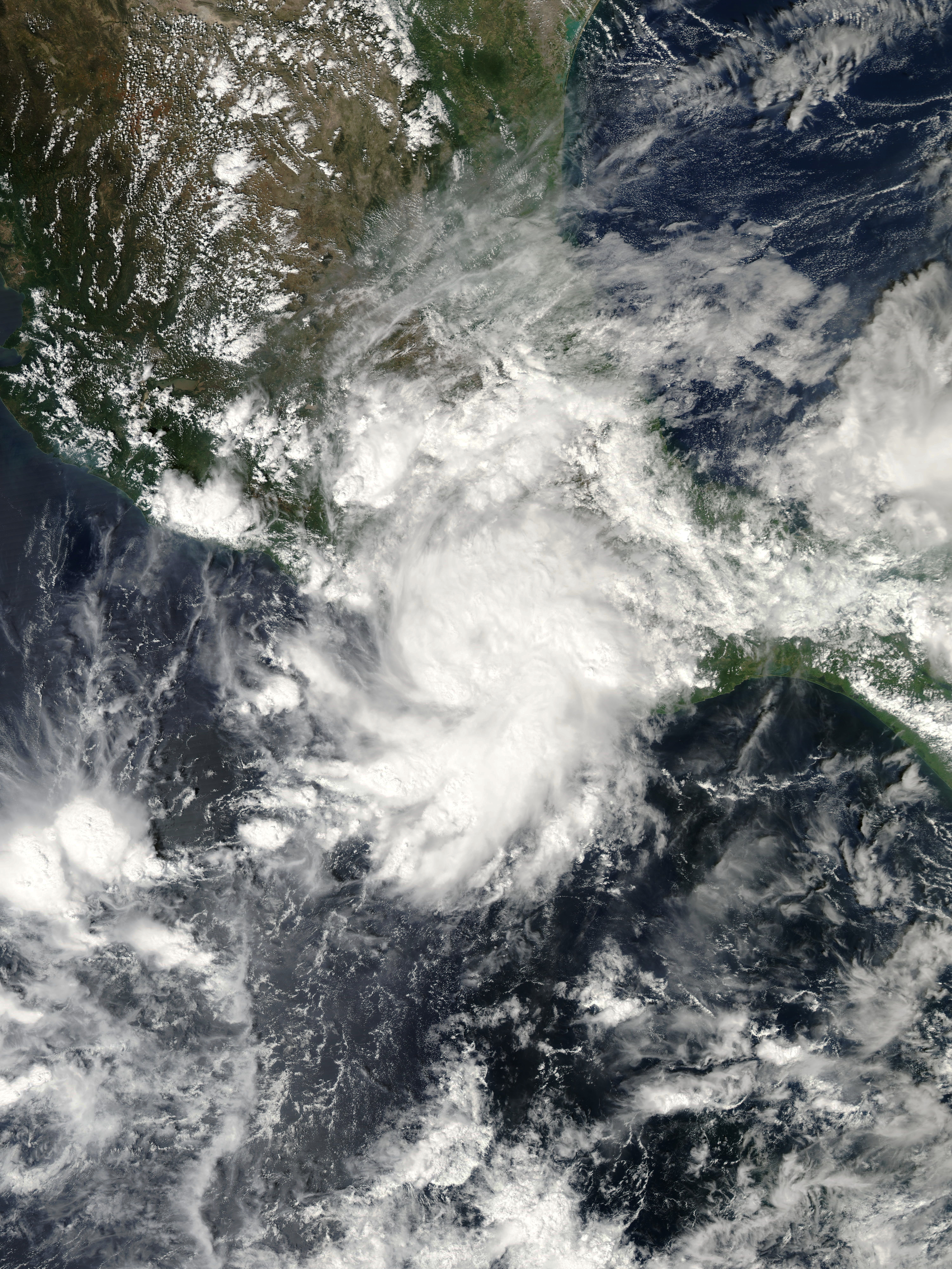
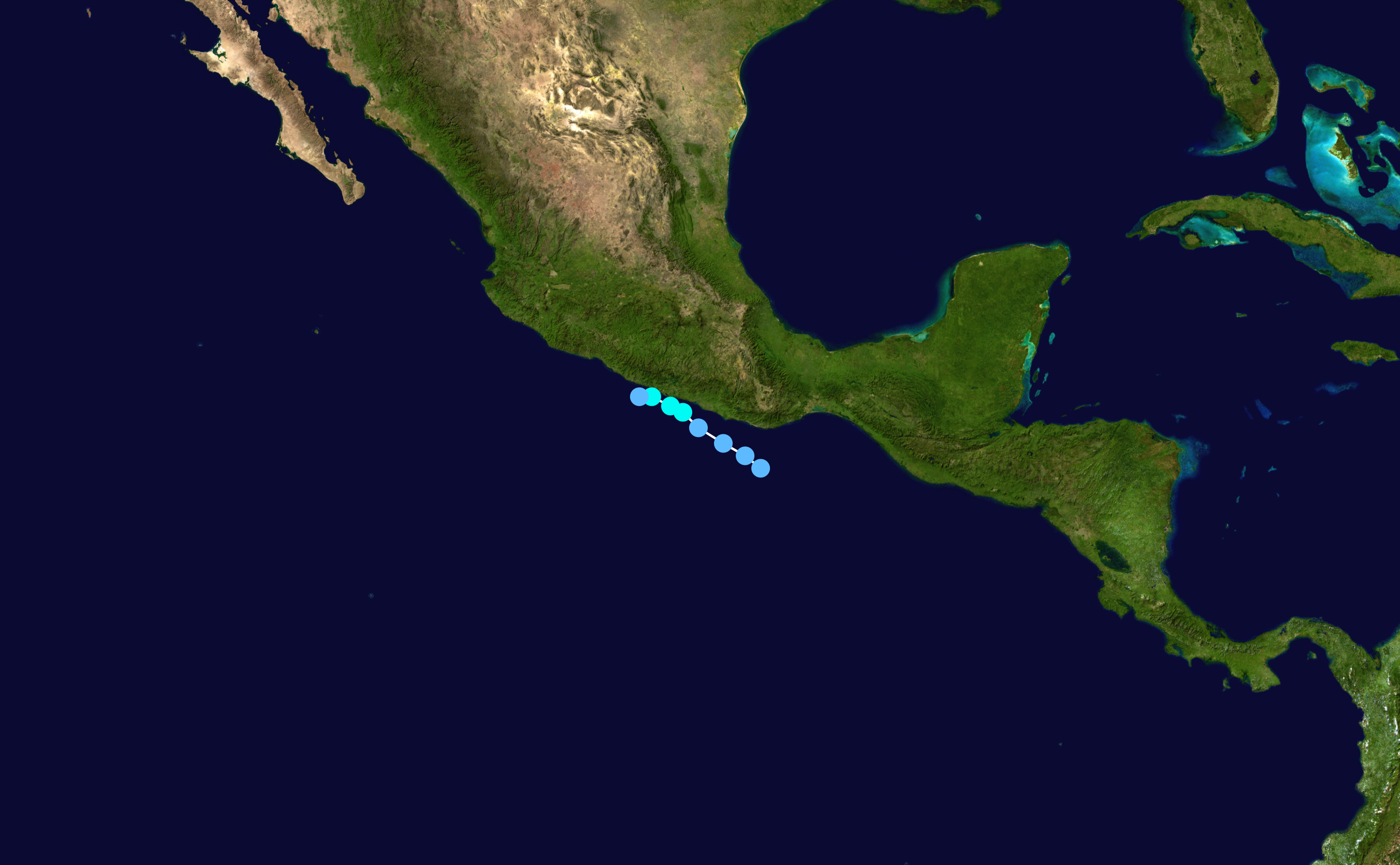
- Duration: October 11 – October 13
- Peak intensity: 50 mph (85 km/h) (1-min); 1000 mbar (hPa)

By October 10, an area of disturbed weather was situated well to the southwest of the Gulf of Tehuantepec. Later that day, a surface low pressure system developed, and convection began to organize into slightly curved bands. The disturbance continued to in this manner, and at 1800 UTC on October 11, the low level circulation had become sufficiently organized to be designated as a tropical depression. At the time, the depression consisted of a well-defined circulation, with some deep thunderstorm activity. Despite weak steering currents, the system started what was initially thought to be a westward drift, though just a few hours later was found to be towards the northwest. A small cyclone, a burst of deep convection formed at around the same time, and was said could have produced tropical storm-force winds.

Continuing its slow, northwestward track under the weal steering currents of a weak mid-level ridge to its north, and a broad cyclonic circulation to its southwest, it was upgraded to Tropical Storm Lester at 1800 UTC on October 12. Originally, it was unclear whether the center of circulation would remain slightly offshore, or move inland. Due to the presence of a weak upper-level anticyclone that was centered just east of the system, favorable atmospheric conditions for strengthening prevailed, and the storm reached its peak intensity with winds of 50 mph (80 km/h) about 6–12 hours after being upgraded to a tropical storm. Early on October 13, radar imagery from Acapulco, Mexico indicated that Lester remained a small and well-organized cyclone as it passed just offshore. At the same time, light southwesterly wind shear began to develop. The interaction with land, combined with influence from the low to the southwest, started to weaken the storm, and it was downgraded to a tropical depression at 1200 UTC on October 13. By later that day, reports from an Air Force Reserve Unit Hurricane Hunter Aircraft indicated that the cyclone had degenerated into a trough on the northeastern side of the larger low to the southwest.

On October 12, in response to Lester, the Mexican government issued a tropical storm watch for the coast between Punta Maldonado to Zihuatanejo. It was upgraded to a warning later that day. It was extended to Lázaro Cárdenas on October 13. Later that day, the warning was lifted when Lester dissipated. Lester brought rains to parts of Oaxaca and Guerrero, reaching 3 to 5 inches (76 to 127 mm). The highest 24-hour total peaked at 106.5 mm (4.19 in), recorded on October 12. The storm capsized two ships, and washed two more ashore. The heavy rain caused mudslides, which buried one man in his home; he was later rescued by his family. In and around the port of Acapulco, minor flooding was reported and 42 trees toppled. Four landslides blocked four roads in Nayarit. A total of 13 families were evacuated in Rosamorada.

=== Tropical Depression Sixteen-E ===
- Tropical depression (SSHWS)
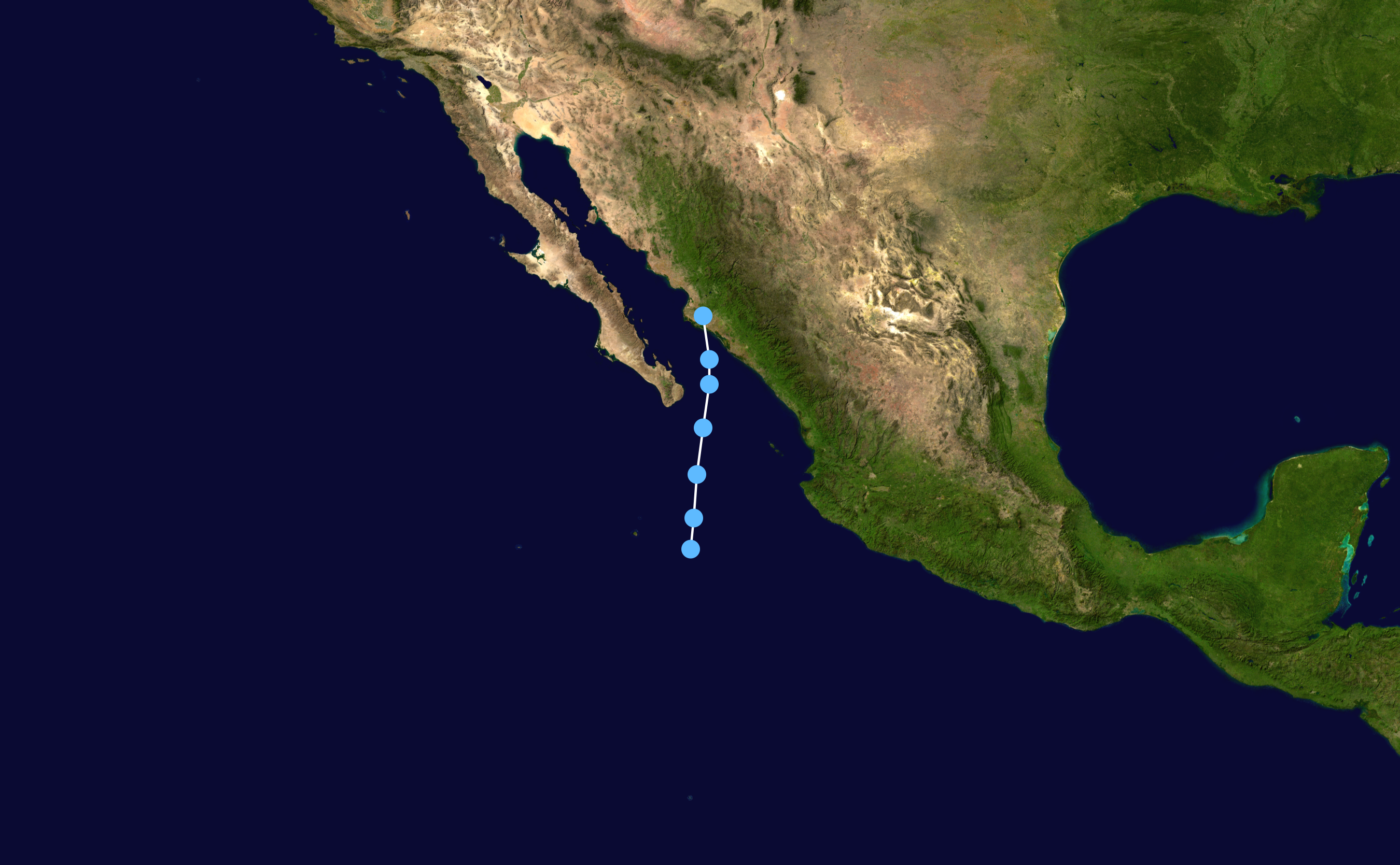
- Duration: October 25 – October 26
- Peak intensity: 35 mph (55 km/h) (1-min); 1004 mbar (hPa)

On October 8, a tropical wave exited Africa, reaching the eastern Pacific ten days later. After gradual organization, it developed into Tropical Depression Sixteen-E on October 25, about 320 mi (510 km) south-southeast of Baja California. It attained peak winds of 35 mph (55 km/h) as it moved northward. Wind shear displaced the thunderstorms, preventing further strengthening. At 10:00 UTC on October 26, the depression moved ashore Sinaloa between Guasave and Topolobampo, and it rapidly dissipated over land. The remnants interacted with a weather front in the southwestern United States.

The depression produced areas of heavy rainfall. At Culiacan, 179.9 mm (7.08 in) of precipitation fell in a 24-hour period; 59.6 mm (2.35 in) fell at Empalme. At the Culiacan airport, a wind gust to 81 mph (130 km/h) was reported. A possible tornado may have also touched down near there. The interaction between the depression's remnants and a frontal boundary over the southwestern United States produced strong thunderstorms and heavy precipitation in eastern New Mexico, western and central Texas, and much of Oklahoma.

=== Other system ===
On August 14, the Japan Meteorological Agency had stated that Tropical Storm Malakas had briefly exited the West Pacific basin and entered the Central Pacific basin, as a weakening tropical depression.

== Storm names ==
The following list of names was used for named storms that formed in the North Pacific east of 140°W in 2004. This is the same list used for the 1998 season. No names were retired from this list by the World Meteorological Organization following the season, and it was used again for the 2010 season.

- Agatha
- Blas
- Celia
- Darby *
- Estelle *
- Frank
- Georgette
- Howard
- Isis
- Javier
- Kay
- Lester
- Madeline (unused)
- Newton (unused)
- Orlene (unused)
- Paine (unused)
- Roslyn (unused)
- Seymour (unused)
- Tina (unused)
- Virgil (unused)
- Winifred (unused)
- Xavier (unused)
- Yolanda (unused)
- Zeke (unused)

For storms that form in the North Pacific between 140°W and the International Date Line, the names come from a series of four rotating lists. Names are used one after the other without regard to year, and when the bottom of one list is reached, the next named storm receives the name at the top of the next list. No named storms formed within the region in 2004. Named storms in the table above that crossed into the area during the year are noted (*).

== Season effects ==
This is a table of all of the storms that formed in the 2004 Pacific hurricane season. It includes their name, duration, peak classification and intensities, areas affected, damage, and death totals. Deaths in parentheses are additional and indirect (an example of an indirect death would be a traffic accident), but were still related to that storm. Damage and deaths include totals while the storm was extratropical, a wave, or a low, and all of the damage figures are in 2004 USD.

Saffir–Simpson scale
TD	TS	C1	C2	C3	C4	C5

2004 Pacific hurricane season statistics
Storm name	Dates active	Storm category at peak intensity	Max 1-min wind mph (km/h)	Min. press. (mbar)	Areas affected	Damage (US$)	Deaths	Ref(s).
Agatha	May 22–24	Tropical storm	60 (95)	997	Revillagigedo Islands, Clarion Island, Southwestern Mexico	None	None	
Two-E	July 2–3	Tropical depression	35 (55)	1007	None	None	None	
One-C	July 5	Tropical depression	30 (45)	1007	None	None	None	
Blas	July 12–15	Tropical storm	65 (100)	991	Northwestern Mexico, Baja California Peninsula, Southwestern United States	None	None	
Celia	July 19–25	Category 1 hurricane	85 (140)	981	None	None	None	
Darby	July 26 – August 1	Category 3 hurricane	120 (195)	957	Hawaii	Minimal	None	
Six-E	August 1–2	Tropical depression	30 (45)	1008	None	None	None	
Estelle	August 19–24	Tropical storm	70 (110)	989	None	None	None	
Frank	August 23–26	Category 1 hurricane	85 (140)	979	Baja California Peninsula	None	None	
Nine-E	August 23–26	Tropical depression	35 (55)	1005	None	None	None	
Georgette	August 26–30	Tropical storm	65 (100)	995	None	None	None	
Howard	August 30 – September 5	Category 4 hurricane	140 (220)	943	Baja California Peninsula, Western United States, California, Arizona	Minimal	None	
Isis	September 8–16	Category 1 hurricane	75 (120)	987	None	None	None	
Javier	September 10–19	Category 4 hurricane	150 (240)	930	Baja California Peninsula, Northwestern Mexico, Southwestern United States, Arizona, Texas	Minimal	3 missing	
Kay	October 4–6	Tropical storm	45 (75)	1004	None	None	None	
Lester	October 11–13	Tropical storm	50 (85)	1000	Southwestern Mexico	None	None	
Sixteen-E	October 25–26	Tropical depression	35 (55)	1004	Baja California Peninsula, Northwestern Mexico, Southwestern United States, Texas, California	None	None	
Season aggregates
17 systems	May 22 – October 26		150 (240)	930		Minimal	None	

== See also ==
- List of Pacific hurricanes
- Pacific hurricane season
- Tropical cyclones in 2004
- 2004 Atlantic hurricane season
- 2004 Pacific typhoon season
- 2004 North Indian Ocean cyclone season
- South-West Indian Ocean cyclone seasons: 2003–04, 2004–05
- Australian region cyclone seasons: 2003–04, 2004–05
- South Pacific cyclone seasons: 2003–04, 2004–05
