= Hurricane Darby (2004) =

Category 3 Pacific hurricane in 2004

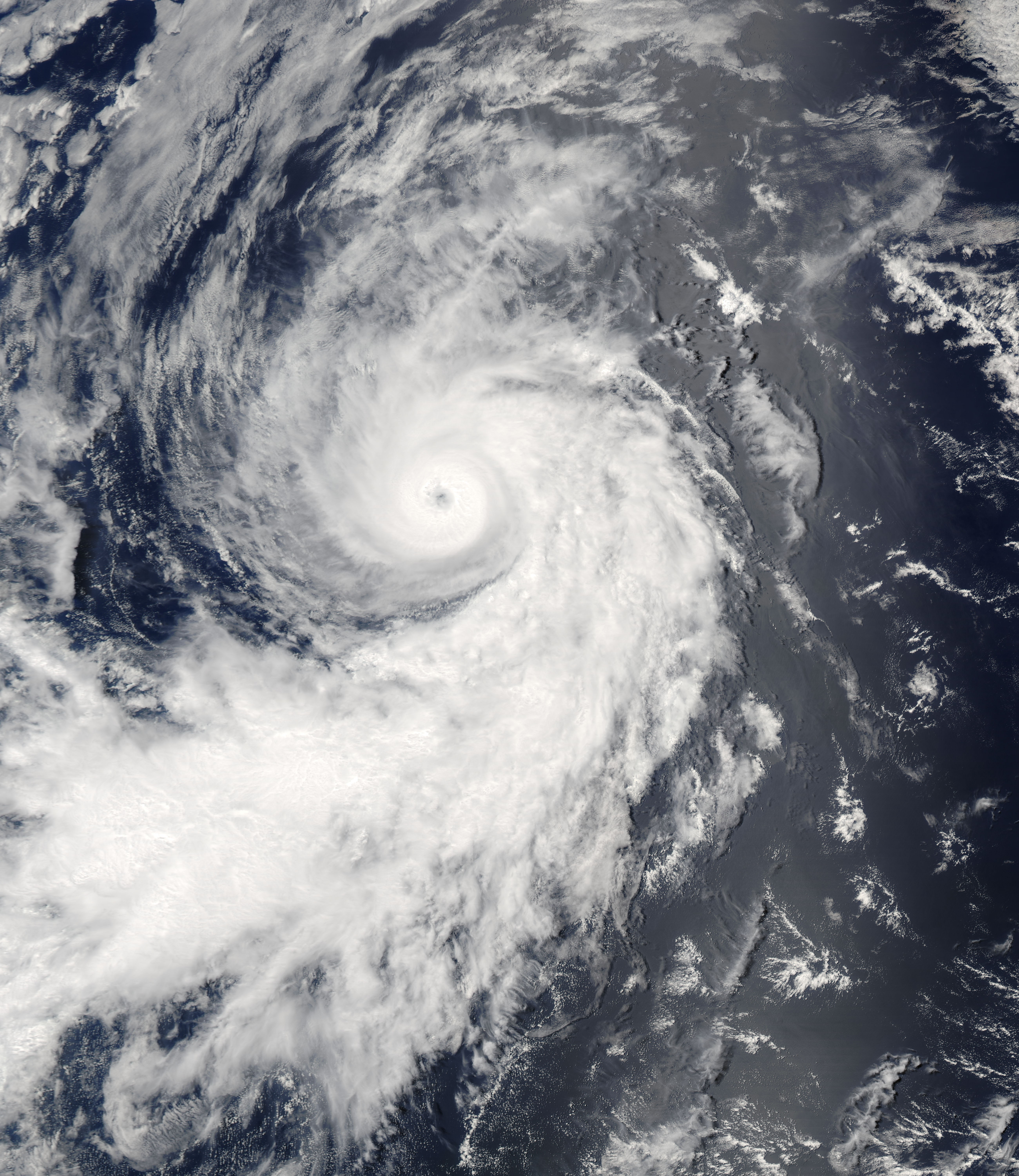
- Hurricane Darby intensifying in the open Pacific Ocean on July 28

Meteorological history
- Formed: July 26, 2004
- Dissipated: August 1, 2004

Category 3 major hurricane
- 1-minute sustained (SSHWS/NWS)
- Highest winds: 120 mph (195 km/h)
- Lowest pressure: 957 mbar (hPa); 28.26 inHg

Overall effects
- Fatalities: None reported
- Areas affected: Southwestern Hawaii
- IBTrACS
- Part of the 2004 Pacific hurricane season

Hurricane Darby was the first Eastern Pacific major hurricane since Hurricane Kenna in 2002. The sixth tropical cyclone, fourth named storm, and second hurricane of the 2004 Pacific hurricane season, Darby developed from a tropical wave that emerged from the west coast of Africa on July 12. After crossing into the Eastern Pacific, the storm became a tropical depression on June 26. The system steadily intensified, and became a hurricane on 000 UTC July 28. Darby peaked as a Category 3 hurricane on the Saffir-Simpson Hurricane Scale, though it quickly deteriorated due to cooler waters and increasing wind shear. While Darby dissipated on August 1, the remnants of the tropical cyclone affected the Hawaiian Islands. The system produced high waves and heavy rainfall that led to extensive flash flooding. Numerous roads were closed, while minor landslides and rockslides were reported. Despite the effects, no fatalities or severe damages occurred.

== Meteorological history ==
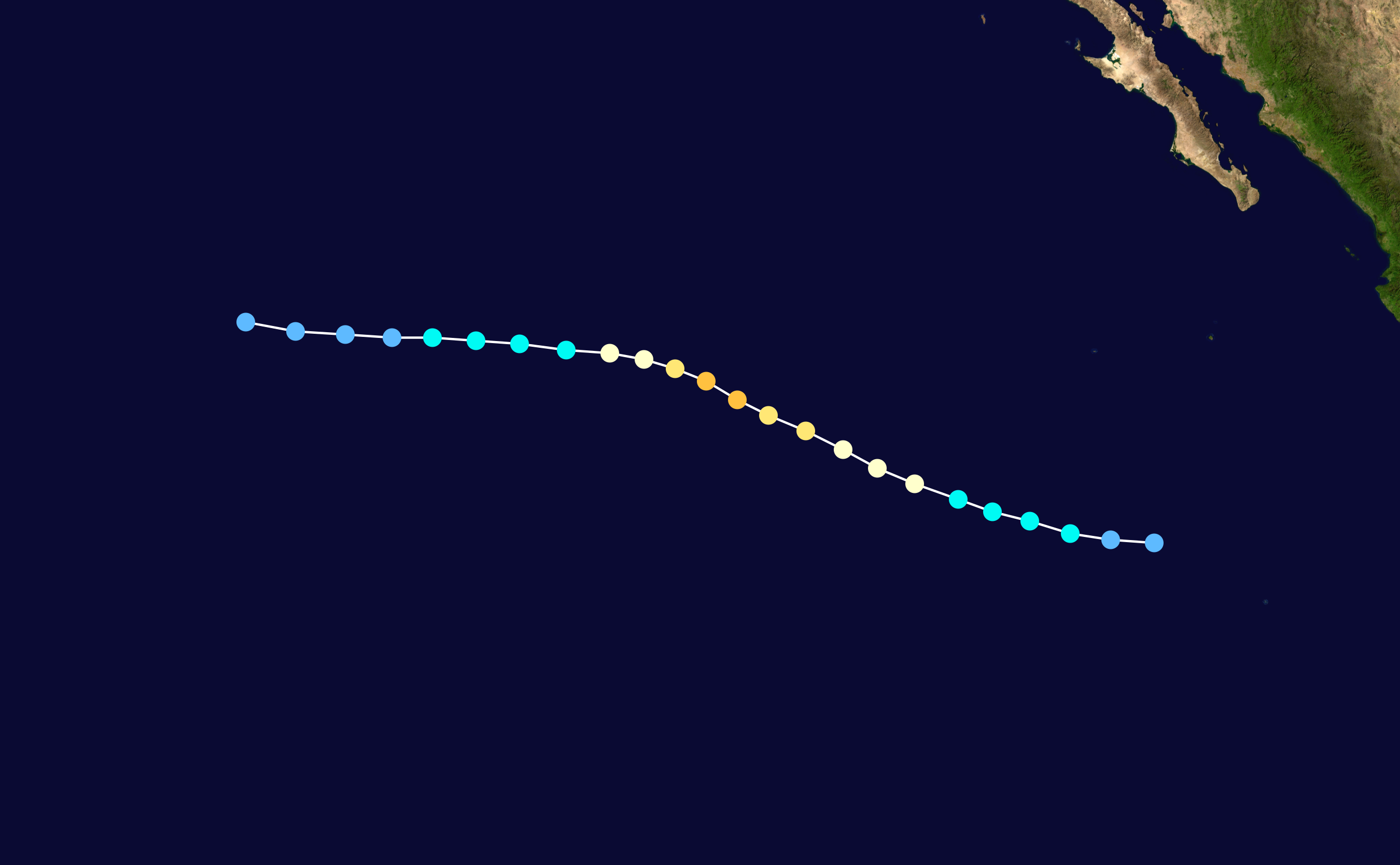
Map plotting the storm's track and intensity, according to the Saffir–Simpson scale Map key Saffir–Simpson scale Tropical depression (≤38 mph, ≤62 km/h) Tropical storm (39–73 mph, 63–118 km/h) Category 1 (74–95 mph, 119–153 km/h) Category 2 (96–110 mph, 154–177 km/h) Category 3 (111–129 mph, 178–208 km/h) Category 4 (130–156 mph, 209–251 km/h) Category 5 (≥157 mph, ≥252 km/h) Unknown Storm type Tropical cyclone Subtropical cyclone Extratropical cyclone, remnant low, tropical disturbance, or monsoon depression

A tropical wave emerged from the west coast of Africa on July 12 and entered the Atlantic Ocean. The wave progressed westward, crossing the Atlantic and Caribbean Sea before crossing into the Eastern Pacific on July 20. The west began to exhibit signs of development on July 23. The next day, the National Hurricane Center (NHC) noted an associated area of showers and thunderstorms, indicating that gradual development was possible. The system had become better organized and on July 25, the NHC continued to remark upon the potential for the weak low pressure area—accompanied by disorganized convective activity—to develop. On July 26, the system became better-organized, and under favorable conditions it was upgraded to a tropical depression at 1200 UTC, while located about 760 miles (1,220 km) to the south-southwest of Cabo San Lucas, Mexico. Under the steering currents of a subtropical ridge of high pressure, the depression continued moving westward.

Upon becoming a tropical cyclone, the depression contained a somewhat well-defined low-level center of circulation, as well as convective banding. Based on Dvorak classifications, the storm was upgraded to a tropical storm at 0000 UTC on July 27; as the fourth tropical storm of the 2004 season, it was named Darby by the NHC. Darby continued to intensify, with established outflow and a well-defined banding feature. Later that day, forecasters predicted the storm to peak as a Category 1 hurricane on the Saffir-Simpson Hurricane Scale. Darby was upgraded to a hurricane at 0000 UTC on July 28, at which time it began to turn towards the northwest. An eye, embedded within the deep convection, developed later in the day. Darby attained Category 2 intensity at around 1800 UTC, and it rapidly strengthened to Category 3, becoming the first Eastern Pacific major hurricane since Hurricane Kenna of the 2002 season.

Shortly after peaking in intensity, Darby moved over coolers waters and began to deteriorate. The eye became less well-defined and the associated convection started weakening. Increasingly colder waters and growing wind shear continued to affect Darby, and the cyclone weakened to a tropical storm on July 30. The low-level center of circulation became exposed from the thunderstorm activity, and the storm quickly degenerated into a swirl of clouds, although it maintained tropical storm strength. On July 31, it weakened to a tropical depression. Darby soon crossed into the Central Pacific Hurricane Center's area of responsibility, and it dissipated as a tropical cyclone on August 1. However, its remnants continued westward under the low-level trade winds, and dropped heavy rainfall on Hawaii several days after the cyclone dissipated.

== Impact ==
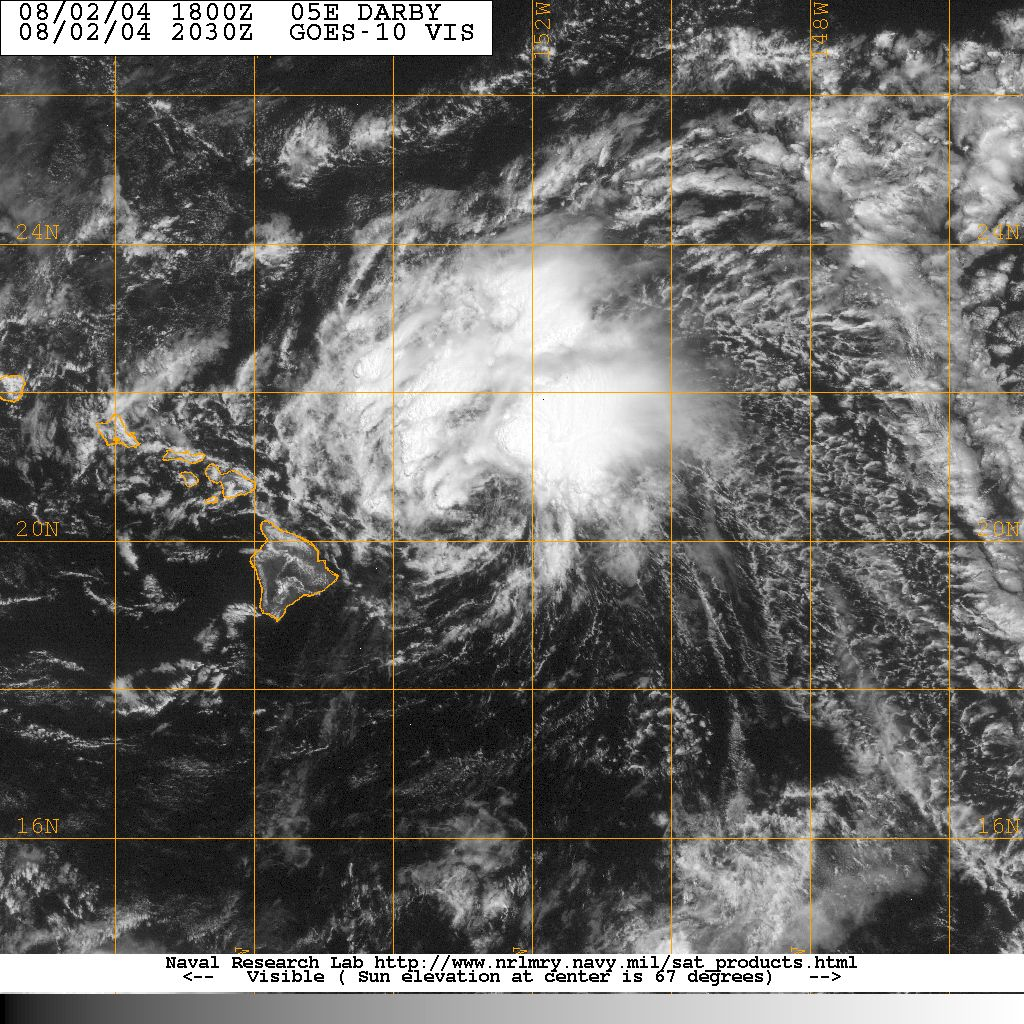
The remnants of Darby approaching Hawaii on August 2

Upon reaching the Hawaiian Islands, the remnants of Darby contributed to heavy rainfall and high winds, prompting the issuance of flash flood watch. Along the eastern shores of Kauai, Oahu, Molokai, Maui, and the Island of Hawaii, the system generated 4 to 8 feet (1.2 to 2.4 m) swells. The Honolulu Airport reported a daily record of 2.92 inches (74 mm) of rainfall, breaking the previous record of 0.96 inches (24 mm) set in 1948. Elsewhere, parts of Maui reported in excess of 8 inches (200 mm) of precipitation, while 4.6 inches (120 mm) fell on Oahu. The heavy rainfall resulted in flash flooding throughout several areas. On Oahu, telephone and electrical service were disrupted, and roads and structures were flooded. A large boulder rolled down a hillside and struck a fire hydrant. On Kauai, the Wailua River exceeded flood stage on August 4. On the island of Hawaii, floods closed five schools, submerged several roads, and triggered rockslides. A portion of the Kamehameha Highway was also closed after being submerged under waters of up to 1.5 feet (0.46 m) deep. Floodwaters closed several roads on Maui, including part of the Piilani Highway. The rainfall was beneficial in some areas, where dry conditions had persisted. Although crop damage from the storm system was limited, some farming operations were postponed and some coffee and nut trees were damaged.

== See also ==
- List of Hawaii hurricanes
- Other tropical cyclones named Darby
- Timeline of the 2004 Pacific hurricane season
- Hurricane Blas (2022)
