= Timeline of the 2004 Pacific hurricane season =

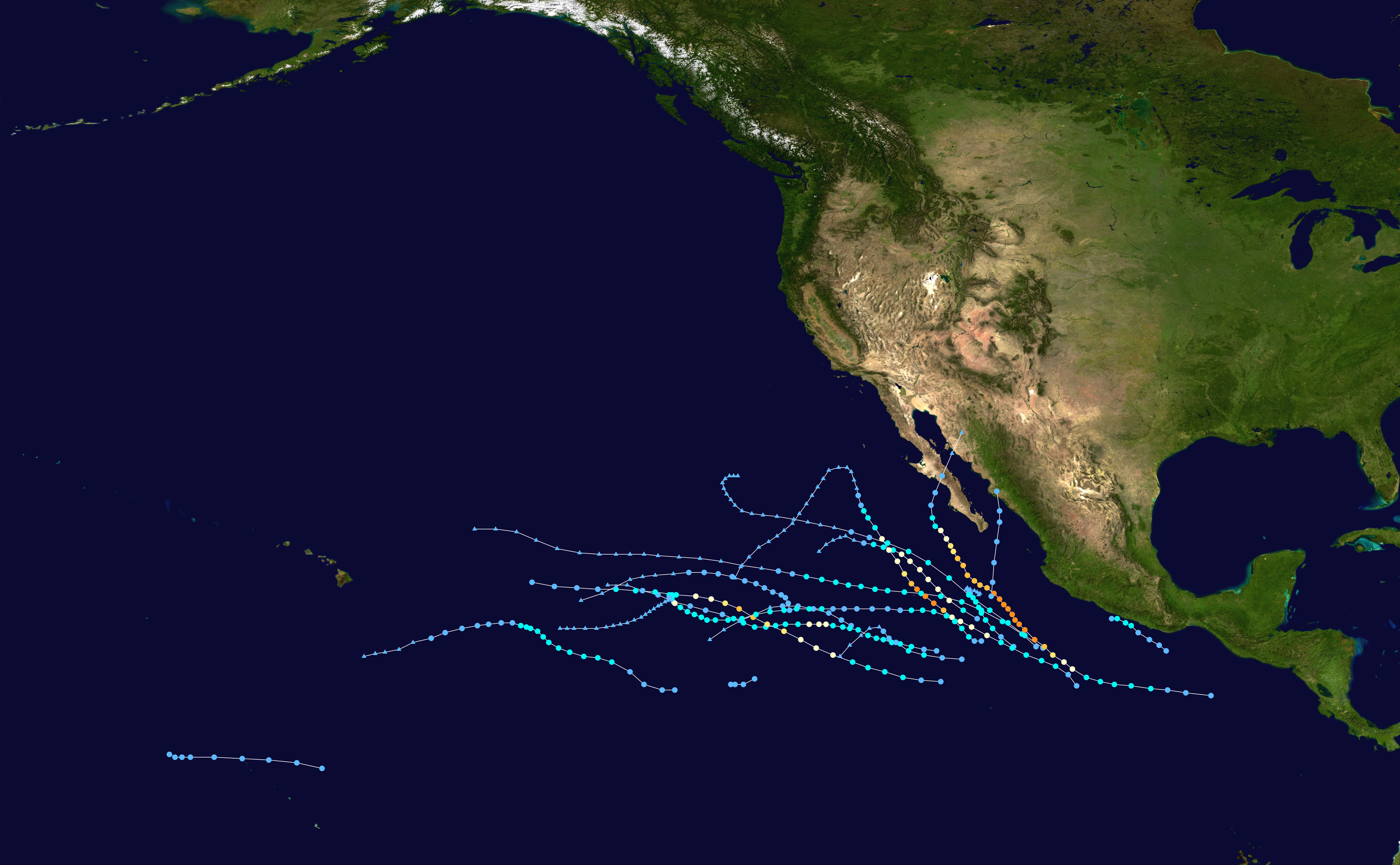
- Season summary map

Season boundaries
- First system formed: May 22, 2004
- Last system dissipated: October 26, 2004

Strongest system
- Name: Javier
- Maximum winds: 150 mph (240 km/h) (1-minute sustained)
- Lowest pressure: 930 mbar (hPa; 27.46 inHg)

Longest lasting system
- Name: Javier
- Duration: 9 days
Storm articles
- Hurricane Darby (2004)
- Hurricane Howard (2004)
- Hurricane Javier (2004)

The 2004 Pacific hurricane season consisted of the events that occurred in the annual cycle of tropical cyclone formation over the Pacific Ocean north of the equator and east of the International Date Line. The official bounds of each Pacific hurricane season are dates that conventionally delineate the period each year during which tropical cyclones tend to form in the basin according to the National Hurricane Center (NHC), beginning on May 15 in the Eastern Pacific proper (east of 140°W) and June 1 in the Central Pacific (140°W to the International Date Line), and ending on November 30 in both areas. However, tropical cyclogenesis is possible at any time of year. The first tropical cyclone of the season, Tropical Storm Agatha, developed on May 22; the final, Tropical Depression Sixteen-E, dissipated on October 26.

Activity during the 2004 season was below average. (Note: Between 1991 and 2020, an average Pacific hurricane season yielded fifteen tropical storms, eight hurricanes, and four major hurricanes.) A total of seventeen tropical depressions formed, with twelve going on to become named tropical storms. Six storms became hurricanes, of which three further intensified into major hurricanes. (Note: A major hurricane is a Pacific or Atlantic hurricane that reaches Category 3 or higher on the five-level Saffir–Simpson scale, with maximum sustained winds of at least 111 mph (179 km/h).) Persisting throughout the season was an area of atmospheric and oceanic conditions hostile to tropical cyclones, including below-average sea surface temperatures and a stable air mass. A strong ridge over Mexico frequently steered systems toward this area, limiting their development. The season's general lack of activity was reflected by an overall Accumulated Cyclone Energy index of 71.1 units, which is the seventh-lowest value on record for a Pacific hurricane season as of December 2024. (Note: Broadly speaking, Accumulated Cyclone Energy is the square of a tropical cyclone's wind intensity in knots at six-hour intervals, multiplied by the length of time it existed.)

Impacts on land were unusually light during the season, largely on account of the aforementioned ridge steering the vast majority of tropical cyclones out to sea. No systems caused any confirmed fatalities, although Hurricane Javier in September caused three fishermen to go missing off the coast of Oaxaca. Javier and Sixteen-E made landfall as tropical depressions in northwestern Mexico, where they caused minor flooding; Sixteen-E also generated locally strong winds and a possible tornado. The remnants of both systems produced heavy rainfall in portions of the western United States. Hurricane Howard in early September washed out roads in western portions of the Baja California peninsula and prompted water rescues in California due to high surf. In mid-October, Tropical Storm Lester caused rainfall of up to 5 in (130 mm) in southern Mexico when it passed close to the coast.

Prior to 2015, two time zones were utilized in the Eastern Pacific basin: Pacific east of 140°W, and Hawaii−Aleutian from 140°W to the International Date Line. For convenience, each event is listed in Coordinated Universal Time (UTC) first, using the 24-hour clock (where 00:00 = midnight UTC), with the respective local time included in parentheses. Figures for maximum sustained winds and position estimates are rounded to the nearest five units (knots, miles, or kilometers) and averaged over one minute, following National Hurricane Center practice. Direct wind observations are rounded to the nearest whole number. Atmospheric pressures are listed to the nearest millibar and nearest hundredth of an inch of mercury. This timeline documents the formation of tropical cyclones as well as the strengthening, weakening, landfalls, extratropical transitions, and dissipations during the season. It also includes information that was not released while the storm was active, meaning that data from post-storm reviews by the National Hurricane Center and the Central Pacific Hurricane Center is included.

== Timeline of events ==
=== May ===
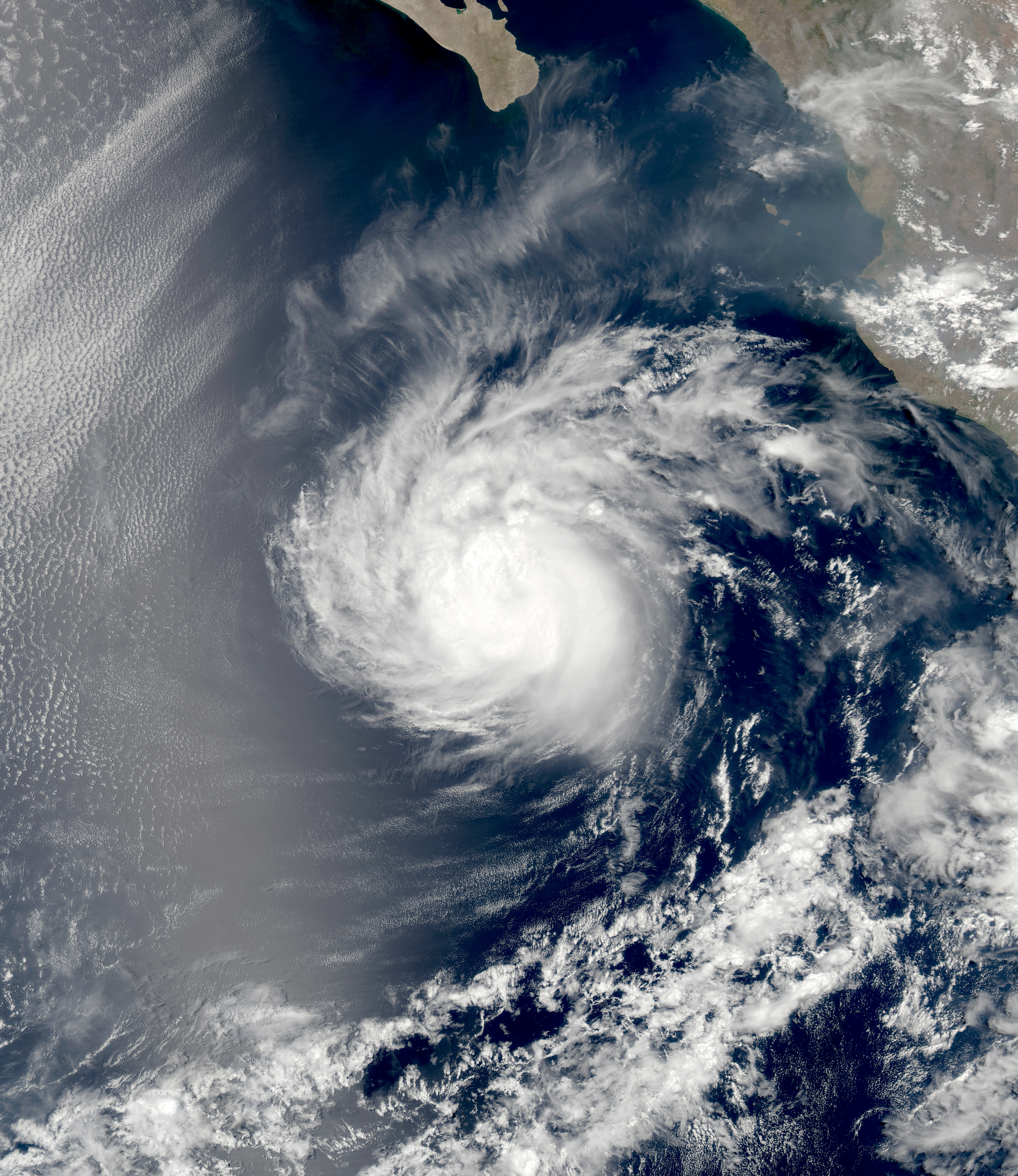
Satellite image of Tropical Storm Agatha just before reaching peak intensity late on May 22

==== May 15 ====
- The 2004 Eastern Pacific hurricane season officially begins.

==== May 22 ====
- 00:00 UTC (5:00 p.m. PDT, May 21) at 14.7°N 107.6°W – Tropical Depression One-E forms from an area of unsettled weather about 585 mi (945 km) south-southeast of Cabo San Lucas, Baja California Sur.
- 12:00 UTC (5:00 a.m. PDT) at 16.0°N 109.1°W – Tropical Depression One-E strengthens into Tropical Storm Agatha about 480 mi (770 km) south of Cabo San Lucas, Baja California Sur.

==== May 23 ====
- 00:00 UTC (5:00 p.m. PDT, May 22) at 17.1°N 109.9°W – Tropical Storm Agatha attains peak winds of 60 mph (95 km/h) and a minimum barometric pressure of 997 mbar (29.44 inHg) about 395 mi (640 km) south of Cabo San Lucas, Baja California Sur.

==== May 24 ====
- 00:00 UTC (5:00 p.m. PDT, May 23) at 18.5°N 110.7°W – Tropical Storm Agatha weakens into a tropical depression about 305 mi (490 km) south of Cabo San Lucas, Baja California Sur.
- 12:00 UTC (5:00 a.m. PDT) at 18.9°N 110.9°W – Tropical Depression Agatha degenerates into a remnant low about 280 mi (455 km) south of Cabo San Lucas, Baja California Sur.

=== June ===
- No tropical cyclones were active in June.

==== June 1 ====
- The 2004 Central Pacific hurricane season officially begins.

=== July ===
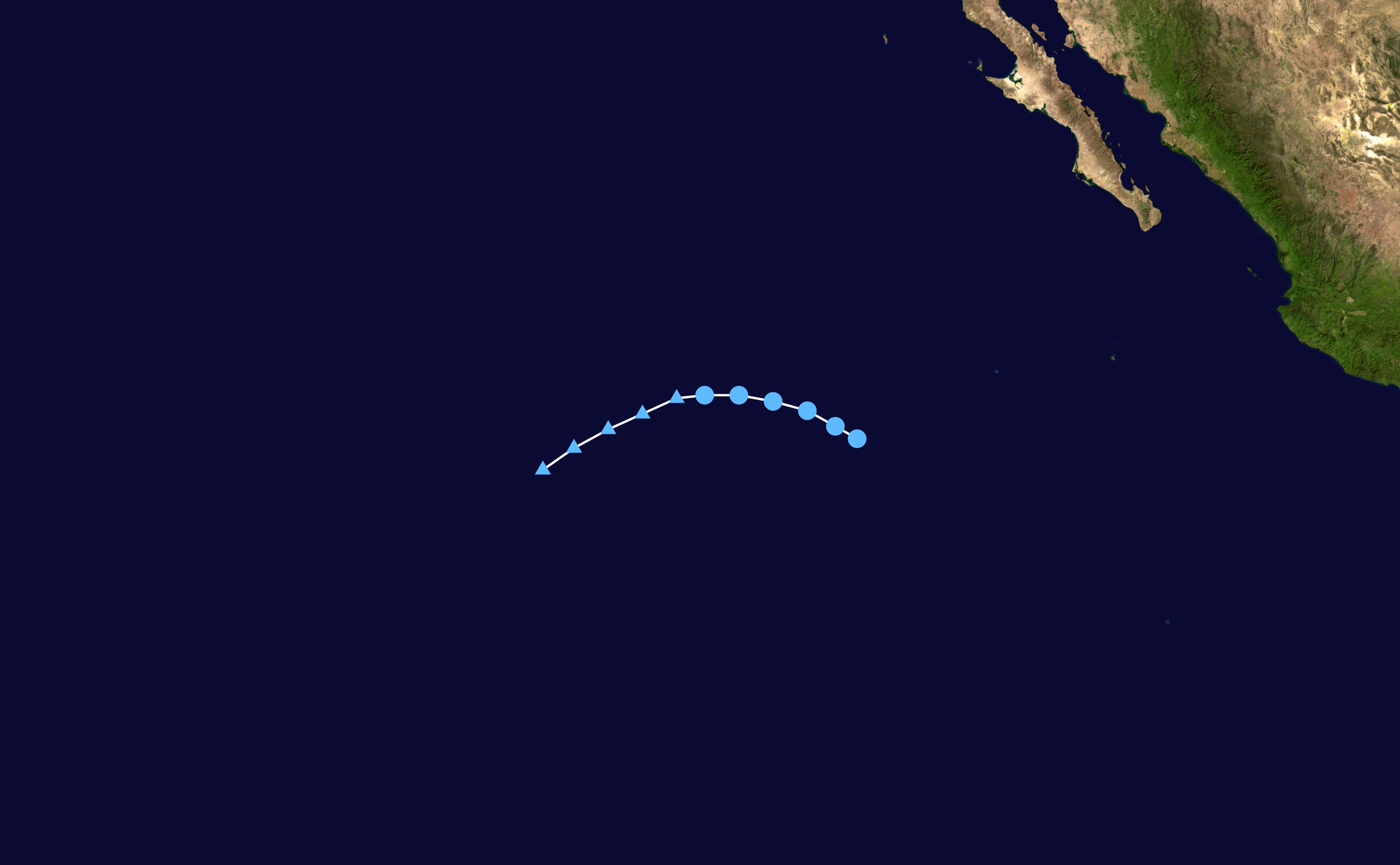

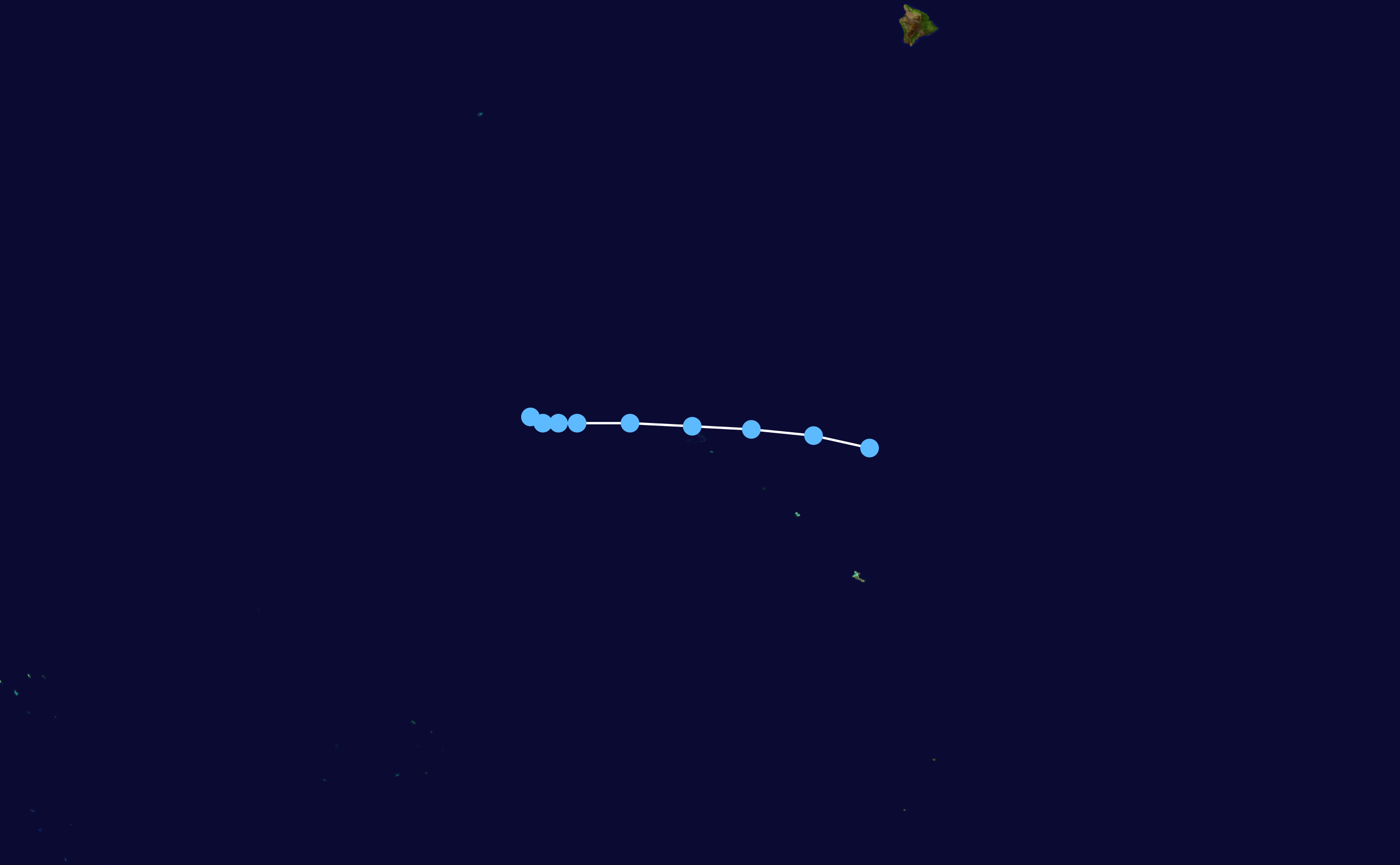
Track maps of tropical depressions Two-E (top) and One-C (bottom), which developed within 48 hours of each other in early July

==== July 2 ====
- 12:00 UTC (5:00 a.m. PDT) at 16.2°N 119.2°W – Tropical Depression Two-E forms from a tropical wave about 760 mi (1,225 km) southwest of the southern tip of the Baja California peninsula.

==== July 3 ====
- 00:00 UTC (5:00 p.m. PDT, July 2) at 17.1°N 120.8°W – Tropical Depression Two-E attains peak winds of 35 mph (55 km/h) and a minimum barometric pressure of 1,007 mbar (29.74 inHg) about 805 mi (1,295 km) west-southwest of the southern tip of the Baja California peninsula.

==== July 4 ====
- 00:00 UTC (5:00 p.m. PDT, July 3) at 17.5°N 125.0°W – Tropical Depression Two-E degenerates into a remnant low about 1,040 mi (1,675 km) west-southwest of the southern tip of the Baja California peninsula.
- 00:00 UTC (2:00 p.m. HST, July 3) at 6.0°N 157.0°W – Tropical Depression One-C forms from an Intertropical Convergence Zone (ITCZ) disturbance about 1,130 mi (1,815 km) southeast of Johnston Atoll. (Note: While the Central Pacific Hurricane Center's (CPHC) year-end report on tropical activity within their area of responsibility in 2004 stated that Tropical Depression One-C formed at 00:00 UTC on July 5, the system's listing in the Eastern and Central Pacific hurricane database (HURDAT) begins 24 hours earlier, at 00:00 UTC on July 4.)
- 18:00 UTC (8:00 a.m. HST) at 6.7°N 162.7°W – Tropical Depression One-C attains a minimum barometric pressure of 1,007 mbar (29.74 inHg) about 835 mi (1,345 km) southeast of Johnston Atoll.

==== July 5 ====
- 00:00 UTC (2:00 p.m. HST, July 4) at 6.8°N 164.7°W – Tropical Depression One-C attains peak winds of 30 mph (45 km/h) about 760 mi (1,225 km) south-southeast of Johnston Atoll.

==== July 6 ====
- 00:00 UTC (2:00 p.m. HST, July 5) at 7.0°N 167.9°W – Tropical Depression One-C is last noted as a tropical cyclone about 680 mi (1,095 km) south of Johnston Atoll; it dissipates shortly thereafter.

==== July 12 ====
- 12:00 UTC (5:00 a.m. PDT) at 14.6°N 105.5°W – A tropical depression forms from a tropical wave about 640 mi (1,030 km) south-southeast of Cabo San Lucas, Baja California Sur.
- 18:00 UTC (11:00 a.m. PDT) at 15.5°N 106.8°W – The tropical depression strengthens into Tropical Storm Blas about 545 mi (880 km) south-southeast of Cabo San Lucas, Baja California Sur.

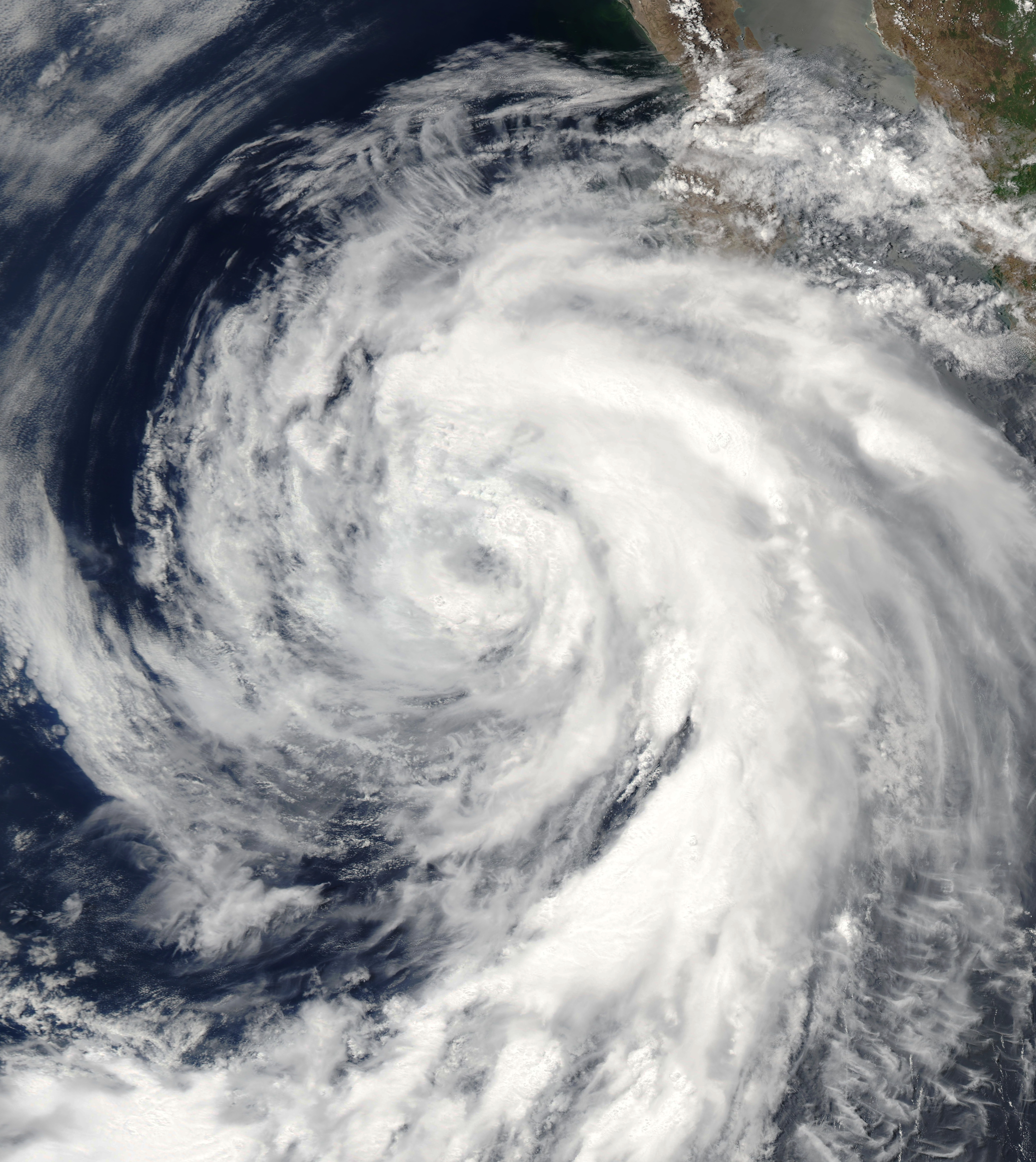
Satellite image of Tropical Storm Blas just after peak intensity late on July 13

==== July 13 ====
- 12:00 UTC (5:00 a.m. PDT) at 18.4°N 110.8°W – Tropical Storm Blas attains peak winds of 65 mph (100 km/h) and a minimum barometric pressure of 991 mbar (29.26 inHg) about 315 mi (510 km) south of Cabo San Lucas, Baja California Sur.

==== July 14 ====
- 18:00 UTC (11:00 a.m. PDT) at 22.5°N 117.9°W – Tropical Storm Blas weakens into a tropical depression about 505 mi (815 km) west of Cabo San Lucas, Baja California Sur.

==== July 15 ====
- 06:00 UTC (11:00 p.m. PDT, July 14) at 23.2°N 120.4°W – Tropical Depression Blas degenerates into a remnant low about 660 mi (1,065 km) west of Cabo San Lucas, Baja California Sur.

==== July 19 ====
- 00:00 UTC (5:00 p.m. PDT, July 18) at 14.4°N 113.1°W – A tropical depression forms from a tropical wave about 620 mi (1,000 km) south-southwest of the southern tip of the Baja California peninsula.
- 12:00 UTC (5:00 a.m. PDT) at 14.7°N 114.9°W – The tropical depression strengthens into Tropical Storm Celia about 650 mi (1,045 km) south-southwest of the southern tip of the Baja California peninsula.

==== July 22 ====
- 00:00 UTC (5:00 p.m. PDT, July 21) at 16.3°N 121.0°W – Tropical Storm Celia strengthens into a Category 1 hurricane about 850 mi (1,370 km) west-southwest of the southern tip of the Baja California peninsula.
- 06:00 UTC (11:00 p.m. PDT, July 21) at 16.3°N 121.5°W – Hurricane Celia attains peak winds of 85 mph (140 km/h) and a minimum barometric pressure of 981 mbar (28.97 inHg) about 875 mi (1,410 km) west-southwest of the southern tip of the Baja California peninsula.
- 18:00 UTC (11:00 a.m. PDT) at 16.3°N 123.0°W – Hurricane Celia weakens into a tropical storm about 960 mi (1,545 km) west-southwest of the southern tip of the Baja California peninsula.

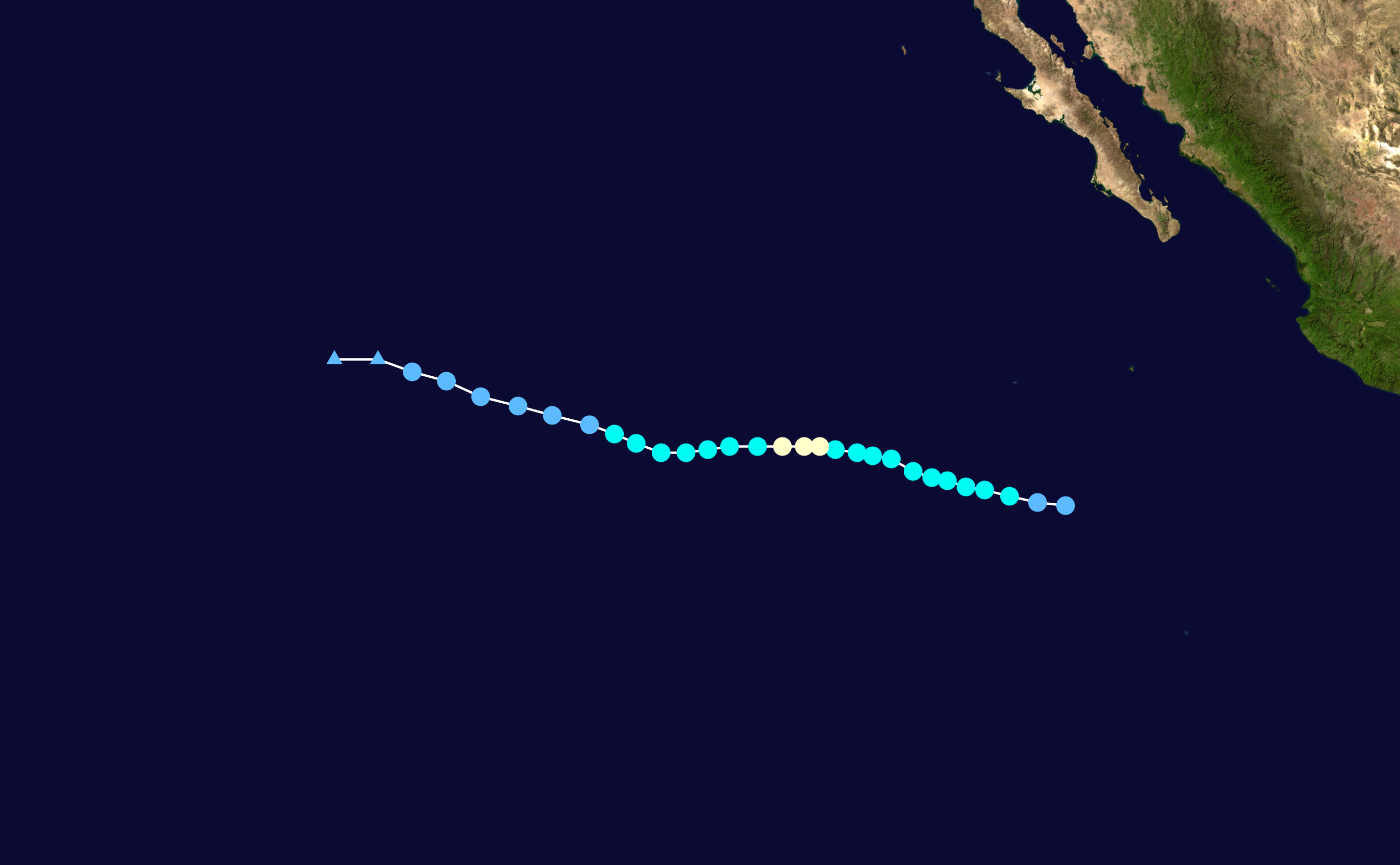
Track map of Hurricane Celia

==== July 24 ====
- 12:00 UTC (5:00 a.m. PDT) at 17.0°N 128.4°W – Tropical Storm Celia weakens into a tropical depression about 1,260 mi (2,030 km) west-southwest of the southern tip of the Baja California peninsula.

==== July 26 ====
- 00:00 UTC (5:00 p.m. PDT, July 25) at 19.1°N 135.2°W – Tropical Depression Celia degenerates into a remnant low about 1,645 mi (2,650 km) west of the southern tip of the Baja California peninsula.
- 12:00 UTC (5:00 a.m. PDT) at 12.2°N 112.8°W – Tropical Depression Five-E forms from a tropical wave about 760 mi (1,225 km) south-southwest of Cabo San Lucas, Baja California Sur.

==== July 27 ====
- 00:00 UTC (5:00 p.m. PDT, July 26) at 12.5°N 115.5°W – Tropical Depression Five-E strengthens into Tropical Storm Darby about 805 mi (1,295 km) south-southwest of Cabo San Lucas, Baja California Sur.

==== July 28 ====
- 00:00 UTC (5:00 p.m. PDT, July 27) at 14.1°N 120.5°W – Tropical Storm Darby strengthens into a Category 1 hurricane about 915 mi (1,475 km) southwest of Cabo San Lucas, Baja California Sur.
- 18:00 UTC (11:00 a.m. PDT) at 15.8°N 124.0°W – Hurricane Darby strengthens to Category 2 intensity about 1,035 mi (1,670 km) west-southwest of Cabo San Lucas, Baja California Sur.

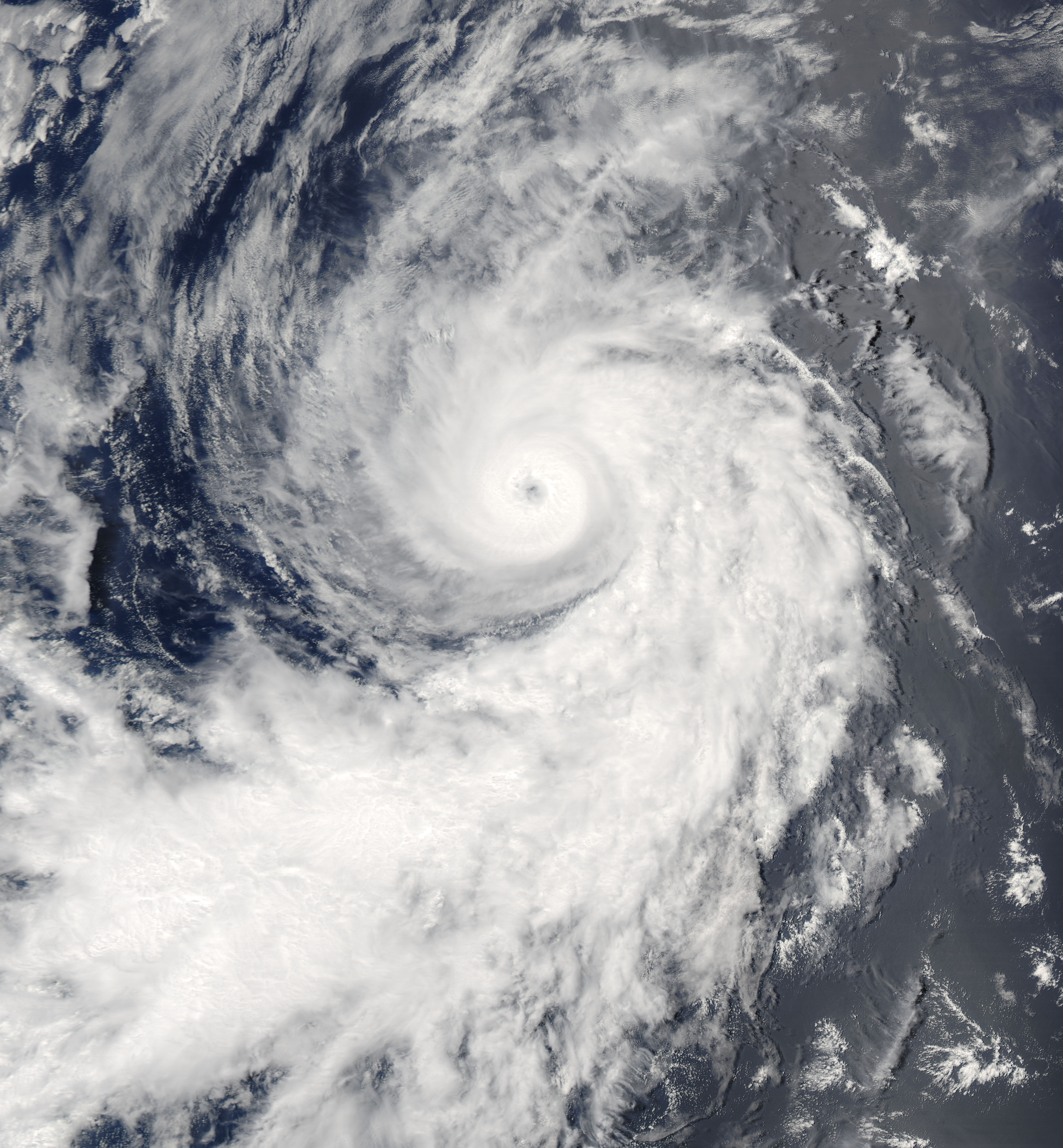
Satellite image of a strengthening Hurricane Darby late on July 28

==== July 29 ====
- 06:00 UTC (11:00 p.m. PDT, July 28) at 16.8°N 126.2°W – Hurricane Darby strengthens to Category 3 intensity about 1,135 mi (1,825 km) west-southwest of Cabo San Lucas, Baja California Sur. This makes it the first Pacific major hurricane since Hurricane Kenna in 2002. It simultaneously attains peak winds of 120 mph (195 km/h) and a minimum barometric pressure of 957 mbar (28.26 inHg).
- 18:00 UTC (11:00 a.m. PDT) at 17.8°N 128.2°W – Hurricane Darby weakens to Category 2 intensity about 1,230 mi (1,985 km) west-southwest of Cabo San Lucas, Baja California Sur.

==== July 30 ====
- 00:00 UTC (5:00 p.m. PDT, July 29) at 18.1°N 129.2°W – Hurricane Darby weakens to Category 1 intensity about 1,290 mi (2,075 km) west-southwest of Cabo San Lucas, Baja California Sur.
- 12:00 UTC (5:00 a.m. PDT) at 18.4°N 131.7°W – Hurricane Darby weakens into a tropical storm about 1,440 mi (2,315 km) west-southwest of Cabo San Lucas, Baja California Sur.

==== July 31 ====
- 12:00 UTC (5:00 a.m. PDT) at 18.8°N 137.3°W – Tropical Storm Darby weakens into a tropical depression about 1,785 mi (2,870 km) west of Cabo San Lucas, Baja California Sur.

=== August ===
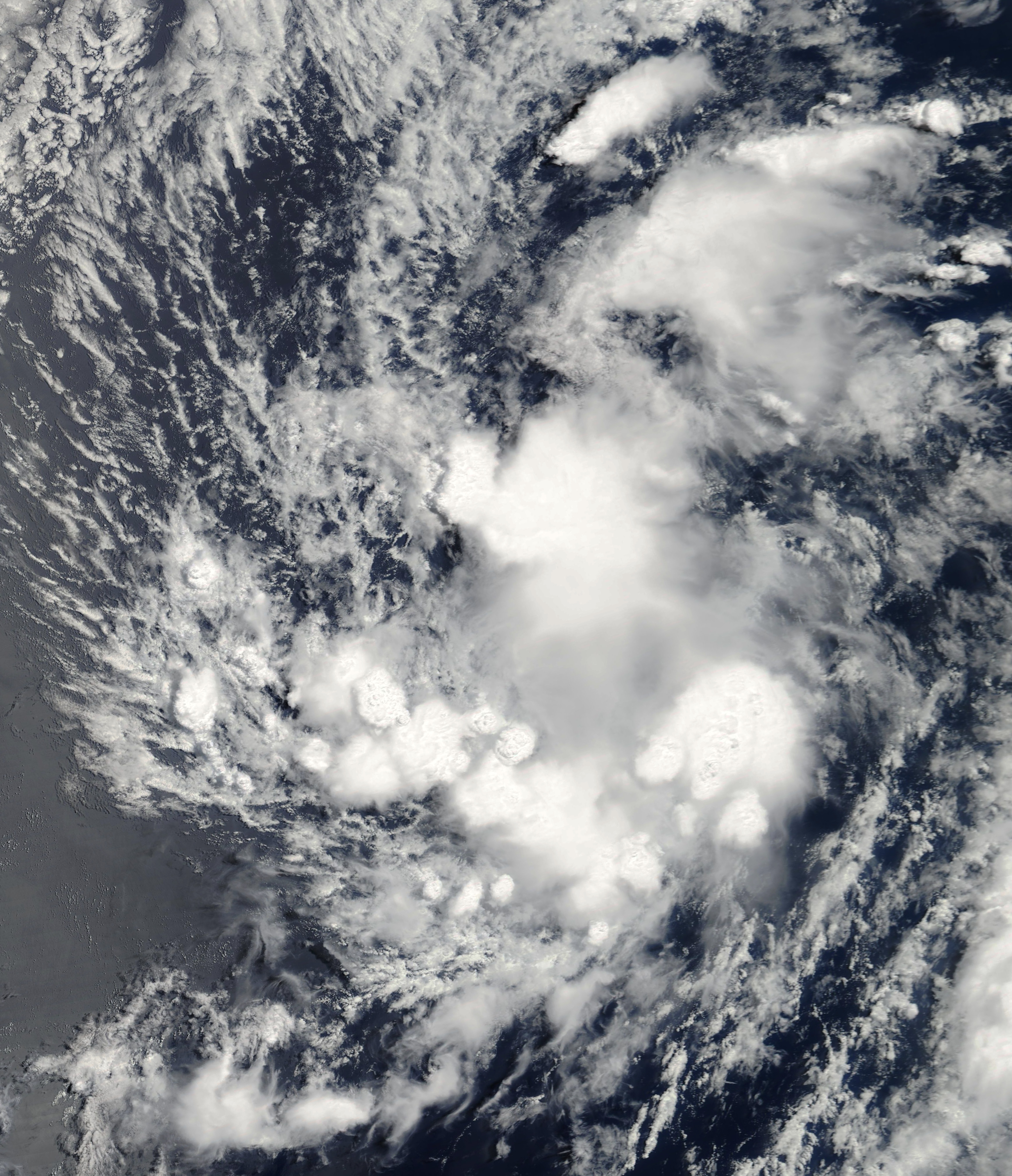
Satellite image of Tropical Depression Six-E late on August 1

==== August 1 ====
- 00:00 UTC (2:00 p.m. HST, July 31) at 19.0°N 140.4°W – Tropical Depression Darby crosses 140°W, leaving the jurisdiction of the National Hurricane Center (NHC) and entering the Central Pacific Hurricane Center's (CPHC) area of responsibility.
- 06:00 UTC (11:00 p.m. PDT, July 31) at 12.4°N 126.1°W – Tropical Depression Six-E forms about 1,285 mi (2,065 km) southwest of Cabo San Lucas, Baja California Sur. It simultaneously attains peak winds of 30 mph (45 km/h) and a minimum barometric pressure of 1,008 mbar (29.77 inHg).
- 12:00 UTC (2:00 a.m. HST) at 19.5°N 143.8°W – Tropical Depression Darby degenerates into a remnant low about 920 mi (1,480 km) east of Honolulu, Hawaii. (Note: The position of Darby's remnants at 12:00 UTC on August 1 is based solely on the CPHC's 2004 year-end report; neither HURDAT nor the National Hurricane Center's Tropical Cyclone Report for Darby provide coordinates for where it ceased to be a tropical cyclone.)

==== August 2 ====
- 00:00 UTC (5:00 p.m. PDT, August 1) at 12.0°N 127.8°W – Tropical Depression Six-E is last noted as a tropical cyclone about 1,395 mi (2,240 km) southwest of Cabo San Lucas, Baja California Sur; it dissipates six hours later.

==== August 19 ====
- 06:00 UTC (11:00 p.m. PDT, August 18) at 11.6°N 131.8°W – A tropical depression forms from an area of unsettled weather about 1,645 mi (2,650 km) east-southeast of Hilo, Hawaii.

==== August 20 ====
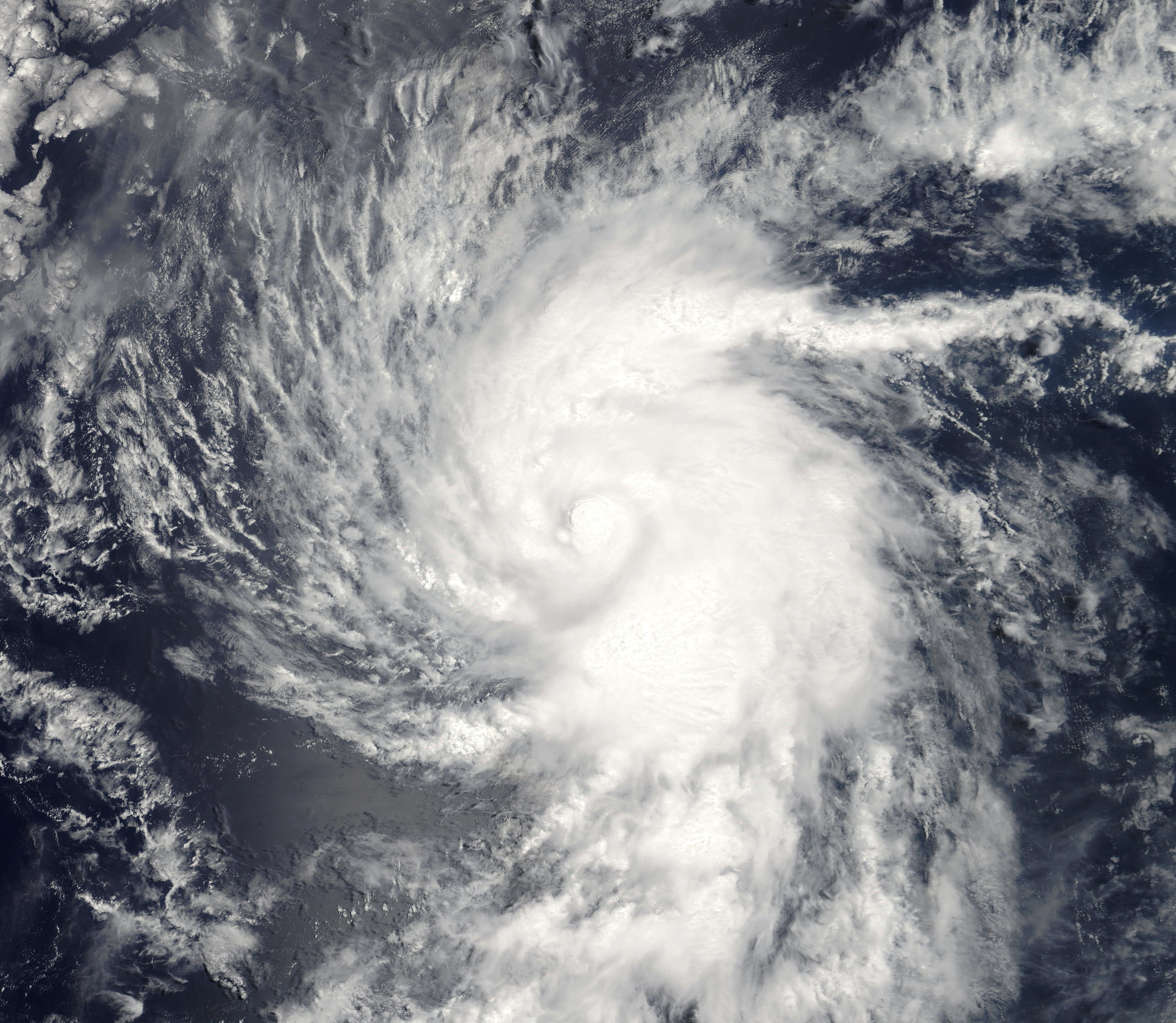
Satellite image of a strengthening Tropical Storm Estelle late on August 20

- 06:00 UTC (11:00 p.m. PDT, August 19) at 13.6°N 136.3°W – The aforementioned tropical depression strengthens into Tropical Storm Estelle about 1,310 mi (2,115 km) east-southeast of Hilo, Hawaii.

==== August 21 ====
- 06:00 UTC (8:00 p.m. HST, August 20) at 14.6°N 140.1°W – Tropical Storm Estelle crosses 140°W, leaving the jurisdiction of the NHC and entering the CPHC's area of responsibility.
- 12:00 UTC (2:00 a.m. HST) at 15.0°N 140.8°W – Tropical Storm Estelle attains peak winds of 70 mph (110 km/h) and a minimum barometric pressure of 989 mbar (29.21 inHg) about 995 mi (1,605 km) east-southeast of Hilo, Hawaii.

==== August 23 ====
- 00:00 UTC (2:00 p.m. HST, August 22) at 16.4°N 143.4°W – Tropical Storm Estelle weakens into a tropical depression about 800 mi (1,290 km) east-southeast of Hilo, Hawaii.
- 06:00 UTC (11:00 p.m. PDT, August 22) at 16.7°N 110.2°W – A tropical depression forms from the remnants of Atlantic Tropical Storm Earl about 425 mi (685 km) south of Cabo San Lucas, Baja California Sur.
- 12:00 UTC (5:00 a.m. PDT) at 17.3°N 111.2°W – The tropical depression strengthens into Tropical Storm Frank about 390 mi (630 km) south of Cabo San Lucas, Baja California Sur.

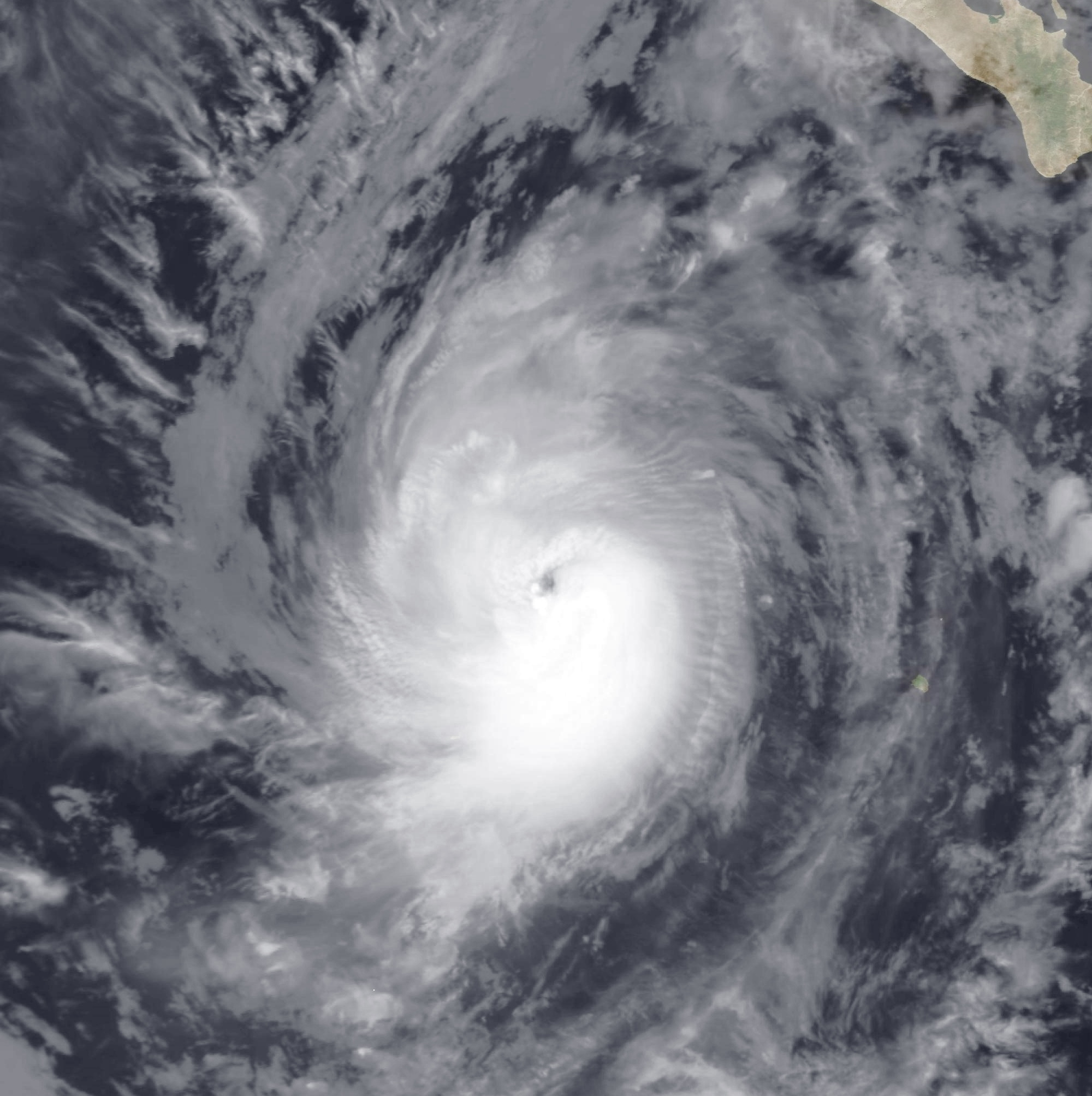
Short-wave infrared satellite image of Hurricane Frank at peak intensity early on August 24

- 18:00 UTC (11:00 a.m. PDT) at 18.0°N 112.0°W – Tropical Storm Frank strengthens into a Category 1 hurricane about 370 mi (595 km) south-southwest of Cabo San Lucas, Baja California Sur.
- 18:00 UTC (11:00 a.m. PDT) at 17.3°N 123.6°W – Tropical Depression Nine-E forms from a tropical wave about 965 mi (1,555 km) west-southwest of Cabo San Lucas, Baja California Sur.

==== August 24 ====
- 00:00 UTC (5:00 p.m. PDT, August 23) at 17.8°N 123.7°W – Tropical Depression Nine-E attains peak winds of 35 mph (55 km/h) about 955 mi (1,540 km) west-southwest of Cabo San Lucas, Baja California Sur.
- 06:00 UTC (11:00 p.m. PDT, August 23) at 19.5°N 113.7°W – Hurricane Frank attains peak winds of 85 mph (140 km/h) and a minimum barometric pressure of 979 mbar (28.91 inHg) about 335 mi (535 km) southwest of Cabo San Lucas, Baja California Sur.
- 06:00 UTC (11:00 p.m. PDT, August 23) at 18.2°N 123.9°W – Tropical Depression Nine-E attains a minimum barometric pressure of 1,005 mbar (29.68 inHg) about 955 mi (1,540 km) west-southwest of Cabo San Lucas, Baja California Sur.
- 18:00 UTC (8:00 a.m. HST) at 15.0°N 150.5°W – Tropical Depression Estelle degenerates into a remnant low about 445 mi (715 km) southeast of Hilo, Hawaii.

==== August 25 ====
- 06:00 UTC (11:00 p.m. PDT, August 24) at 21.6°N 116.2°W – Hurricane Frank weakens into a tropical storm about 410 mi (660 km) west-southwest of Cabo San Lucas, Baja California Sur.

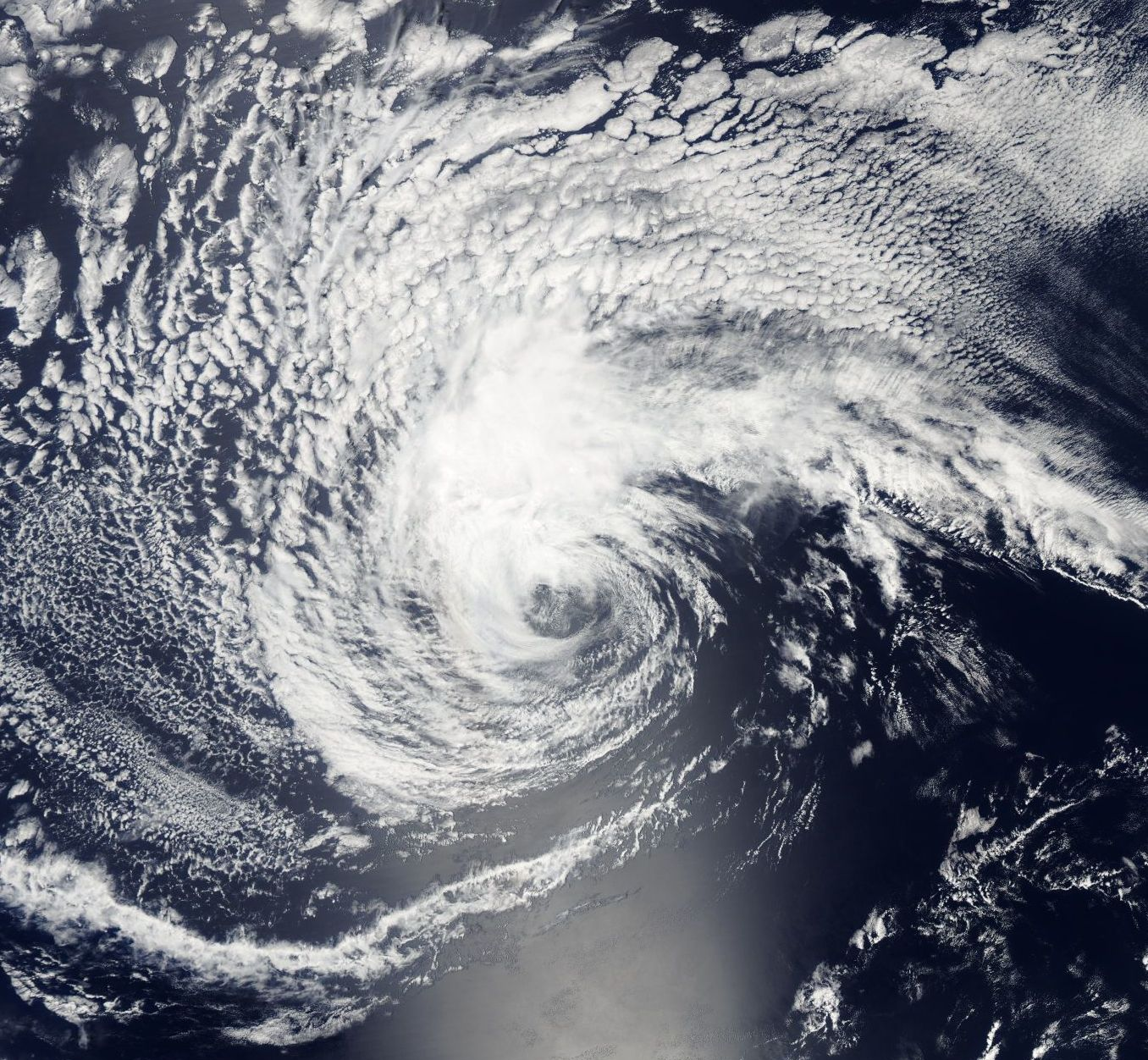
Satellite image of Tropical Depression Nine-E late on August 25

==== August 26 ====
- 00:00 UTC (5:00 p.m. PDT, August 25) at 22.1°N 118.3°W – Tropical Storm Frank weakens into a tropical depression about 535 mi (860 km) west of Cabo San Lucas, Baja California Sur.
- 06:00 UTC (11:00 p.m. PDT, August 25) at 22.3°N 119.0°W – Tropical Depression Frank degenerates into a remnant low about 575 mi (925 km) west of Cabo San Lucas, Baja California Sur.
- 12:00 UTC (5:00 a.m. PDT) at 14.7°N 106.0°W – A tropical depression forms from a tropical wave about 620 mi (1,000 km) south-southeast of the southern tip of the Baja California peninsula.
- 18:00 UTC (11:00 a.m. PDT) at 19.9°N 131.9°W – Tropical Depression Nine-E degenerates into a remnant low about 1,420 mi (2,290 km) west of Cabo San Lucas, Baja California Sur.
- 18:00 UTC (11:00 a.m. PDT) at 15.6°N 107.0°W – The tropical depression that had formed six hours earlier strengthens into Tropical Storm Georgette about 540 mi (870 km) south-southeast of the southern tip of the Baja California peninsula.

==== August 27 ====
- 12:00 UTC (5:00 a.m. PDT) at 17.9°N 111.3°W – Tropical Storm Georgette attains peak winds of 65 mph (100 km/h) and a minimum barometric pressure of 995 mbar (29.38 inHg) about 355 mi (575 km) south-southwest of the southern tip of the Baja California peninsula.

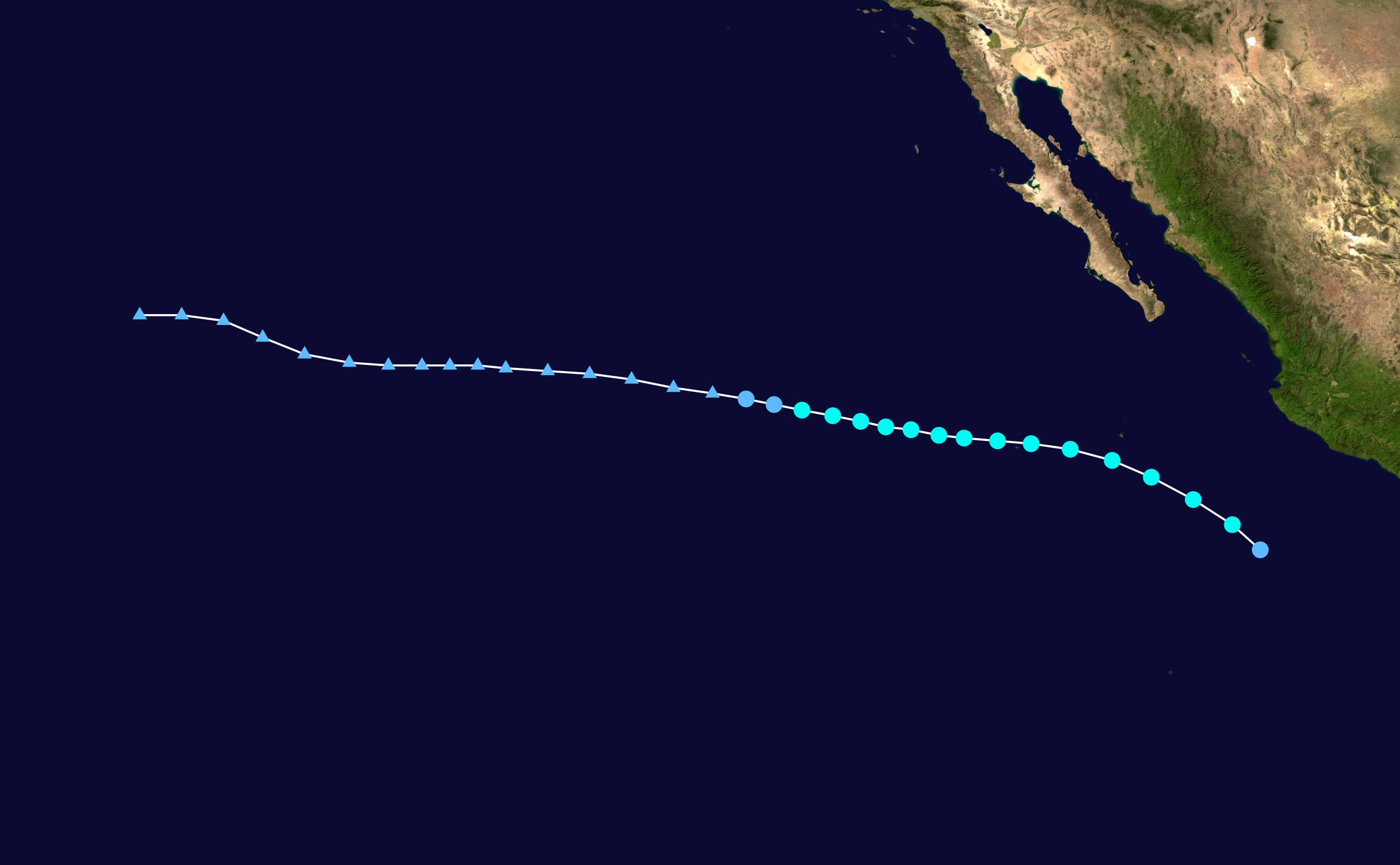
Track map of Tropical Storm Georgette

==== August 30 ====
- 06:00 UTC (11:00 p.m. PDT, August 29) at 19.9°N 123.4°W – After oscillating between winds of 50 mph (85 km/h) and 60 mph (95 km/h) for two days, Tropical Storm Georgette weakens into a tropical depression about 885 mi (1,425 km) west-southwest of the southern tip of the Baja California peninsula.
- 12:00 UTC (5:00 a.m. PDT) at 11.9°N 103.1°W – A tropical depression forms from a tropical wave about 405 mi (650 km) south-southwest of Acapulco, Guerrero.
- 18:00 UTC (11:00 a.m. PDT) at 20.3°N 125.6°W – Tropical Depression Georgette degenerates into a remnant low about 1,020 mi (1,640 km) west of the southern tip of the Baja California peninsula.

==== August 31 ====
- 00:00 UTC (5:00 p.m. PDT, August 30) at 13.3°N 104.6°W – The tropical depression that had formed 12 hours prior strengthens into Tropical Storm Howard about 395 mi (640 km) southwest of Acapulco, Guerrero.

=== September ===
==== September 1 ====
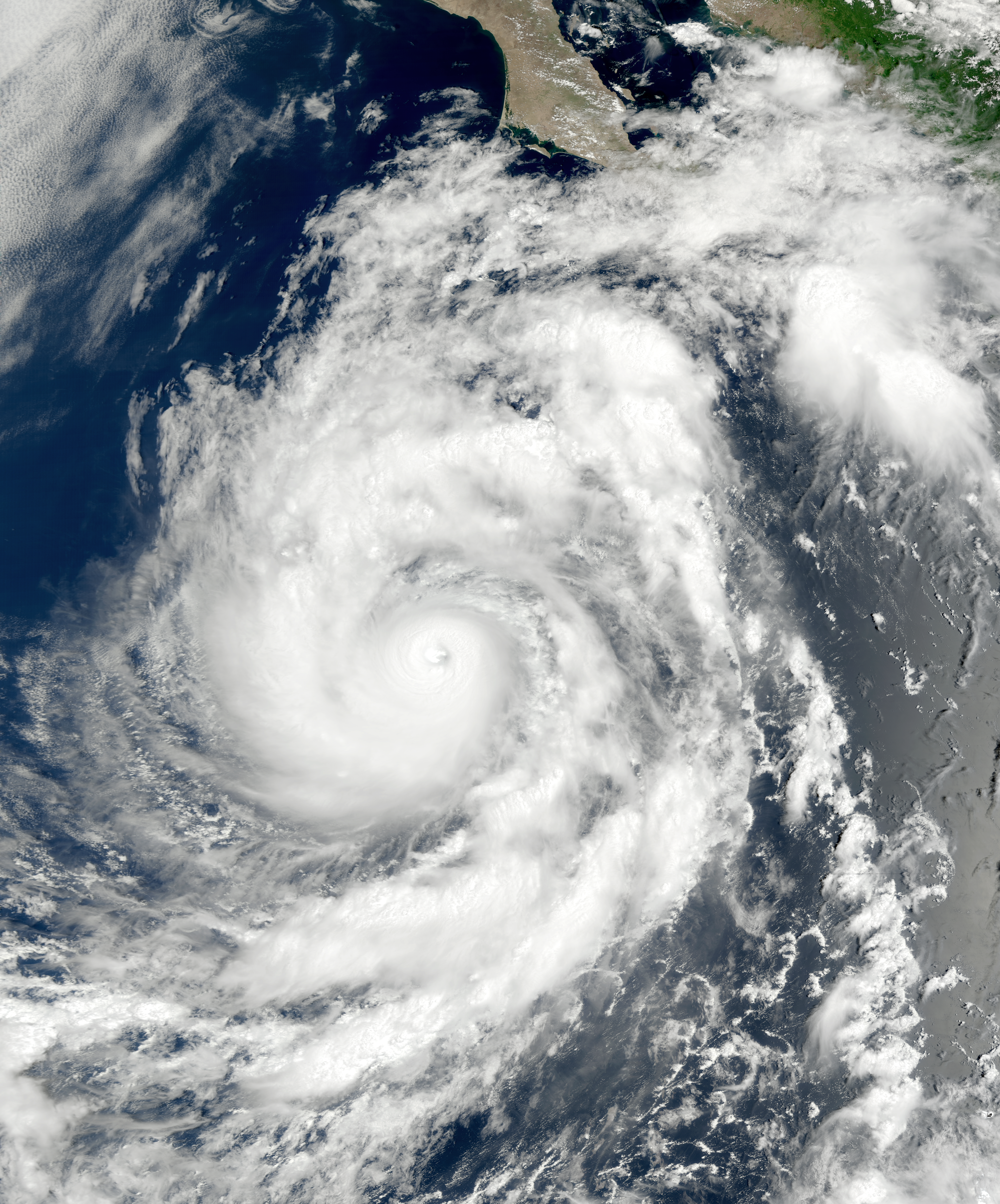
Satellite image of Hurricane Howard at peak intensity on September 2

- 06:00 UTC (11:00 p.m. PDT, August 31) at 15.5°N 109.5°W – Tropical Storm Howard strengthens into a Category 1 hurricane about 645 mi (1,040 km) west of Acapulco, Guerrero.

==== September 2 ====
- 06:00 UTC (11:00 p.m. PDT, September 1) at 17.3°N 112.6°W – Hurricane Howard rapidly strengthens to Category 3 intensity, skipping Category 2 status, about 840 mi (1,355 km) west of Acapulco, Guerrero. This makes it the second major hurricane of the season.
- 12:00 UTC (5:00 a.m. PDT) at 17.8°N 113.3°W – Hurricane Howard strengthens to Category 4 intensity about 885 mi (1,425 km) west of Acapulco, Guerrero. It simultaneously attains peak winds of 140 mph (220 km/h) and a minimum barometric pressure of 943 mbar (27.85 inHg).

==== September 3 ====
- 06:00 UTC (11:00 p.m. PDT, September 2) at 19.2°N 114.9°W – Hurricane Howard weakens to Category 3 intensity about 600 mi (965 km) south of Punta Eugenia, Baja California Sur.
- 12:00 UTC (5:00 a.m. PDT) at 19.9°N 115.4°W – Hurricane Howard weakens to Category 2 intensity about 545 mi (880 km) south of Punta Eugenia, Baja California Sur.
- 18:00 UTC (11:00 a.m. PDT) at 20.8°N 115.9°W – Hurricane Howard weakens to Category 1 intensity about 490 mi (790 km) south of Punta Eugenia, Baja California Sur.

==== September 4 ====
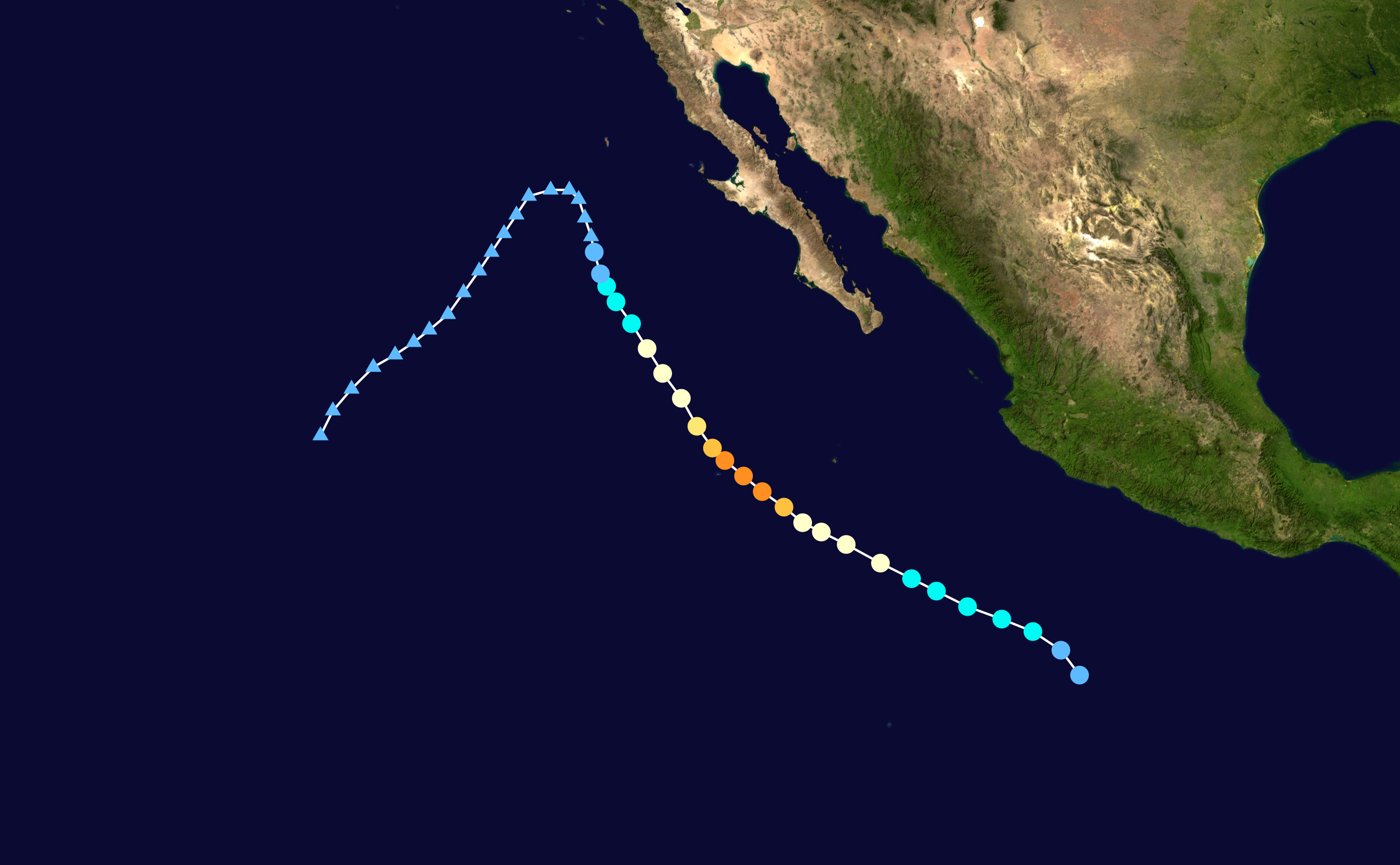
Track map of Hurricane Howard

- 12:00 UTC (5:00 a.m. PDT) at 23.2°N 117.5°W – Hurricane Howard weakens into a tropical storm about 355 mi (575 km) south-southwest of Punta Eugenia, Baja California Sur.

==== September 5 ====
- 06:00 UTC (11:00 p.m. PDT, September 4) at 24.8°N 118.5°W – Tropical Storm Howard weakens into a tropical depression about 300 mi (480 km) southwest of Punta Eugenia, Baja California Sur.
- 18:00 UTC (11:00 a.m. PDT) at 26.0°N 118.8°W – Tropical Depression Howard degenerates into a remnant low about 265 mi (425 km) west-southwest of Punta Eugenia, Baja California Sur.

==== September 8 ====
- 06:00 UTC (11:00 p.m. PDT, September 7) at 15.1°N 109.9°W – A tropical depression forms from a tropical wave about 535 mi (860 km) south of Cabo San Lucas, Baja California Sur.
- 18:00 UTC (11:00 a.m. PDT) at 15.4°N 110.8°W – The tropical depression strengthens into Tropical Storm Isis about 520 mi (835 km) south of Cabo San Lucas, Baja California Sur.

==== September 10 ====
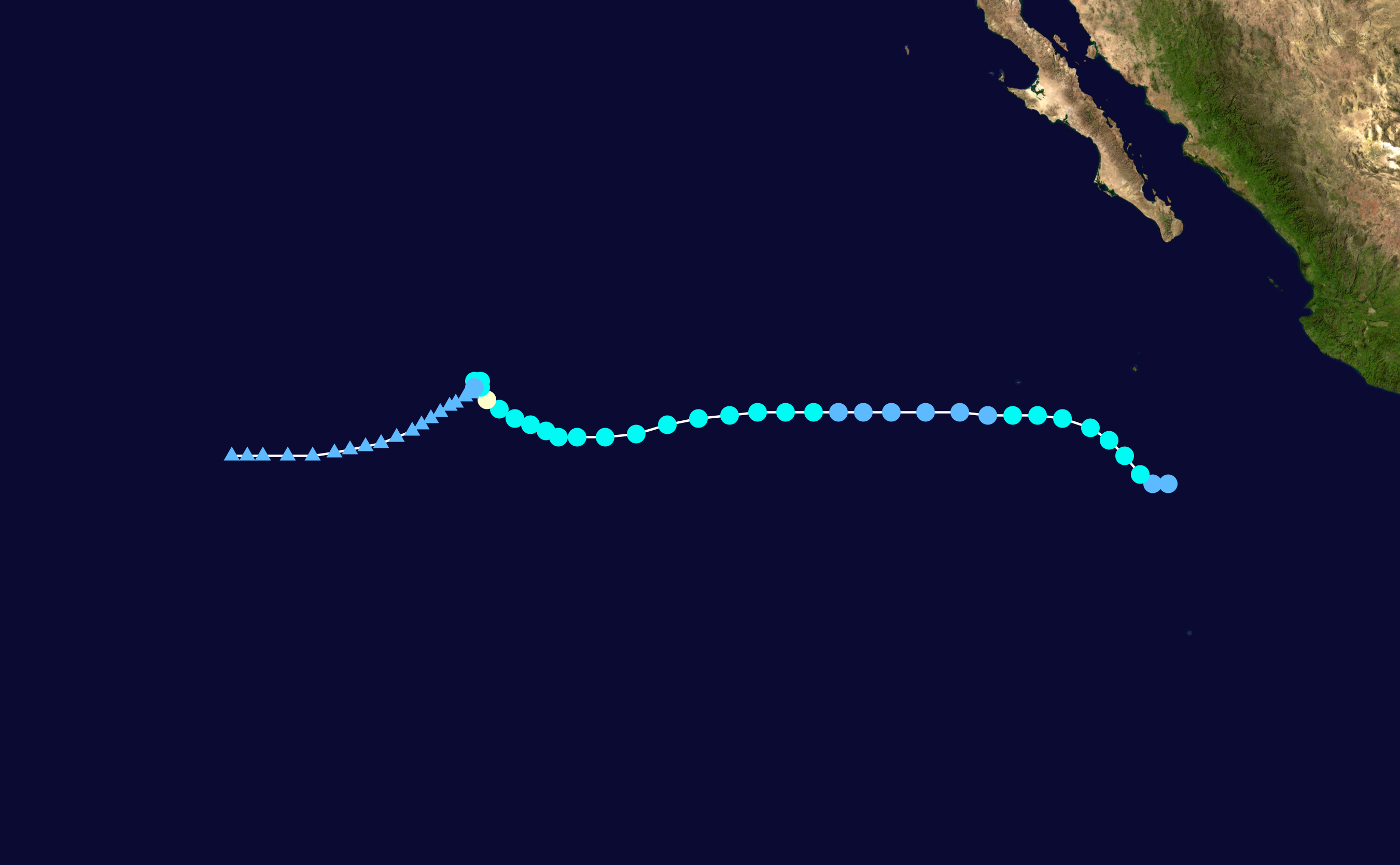
Track map of Hurricane Isis

- 00:00 UTC (5:00 p.m. PDT, September 9) at 17.3°N 114.1°W – Tropical Storm Isis reaches its initial peak intensity, with winds of 45 mph (75 km/h) and a barometric pressure of 1,002 mbar (29.59 inHg), about 470 mi (760 km) southwest of Cabo San Lucas, Baja California Sur.
- 12:00 UTC (5:00 a.m. PDT) at 17.3°N 115.7°W – Tropical Storm Isis weakens into a tropical depression about 535 mi (860 km) southwest of Cabo San Lucas, Baja California Sur.
- 18:00 UTC (11:00 a.m. PDT) at 11.2°N 93.5°W – A tropical depression forms from a tropical wave about 365 mi (585 km) south-southeast of Salina Cruz, Oaxaca.

==== September 11 ====
- 12:00 UTC (5:00 a.m. PDT) at 11.7°N 97.8°W – The tropical depression that had formed 18 hours prior strengthens into Tropical Storm Javier about 355 mi (575 km) south-southwest of Salina Cruz, Oaxaca.

==== September 12 ====
- 00:00 UTC (5:00 p.m. PDT, September 11) at 17.4°N 121.3°W – Tropical Depression Isis restrengthens into a tropical storm about 830 mi (1,335 km) west-southwest of Cabo San Lucas, Baja California Sur.
- 18:00 UTC (11:00 a.m. PDT) at 13.1°N 103.4°W – Tropical Storm Javier strengthens into a Category 1 hurricane about 415 mi (665 km) south of Manzanillo, Colima.

==== September 13 ====
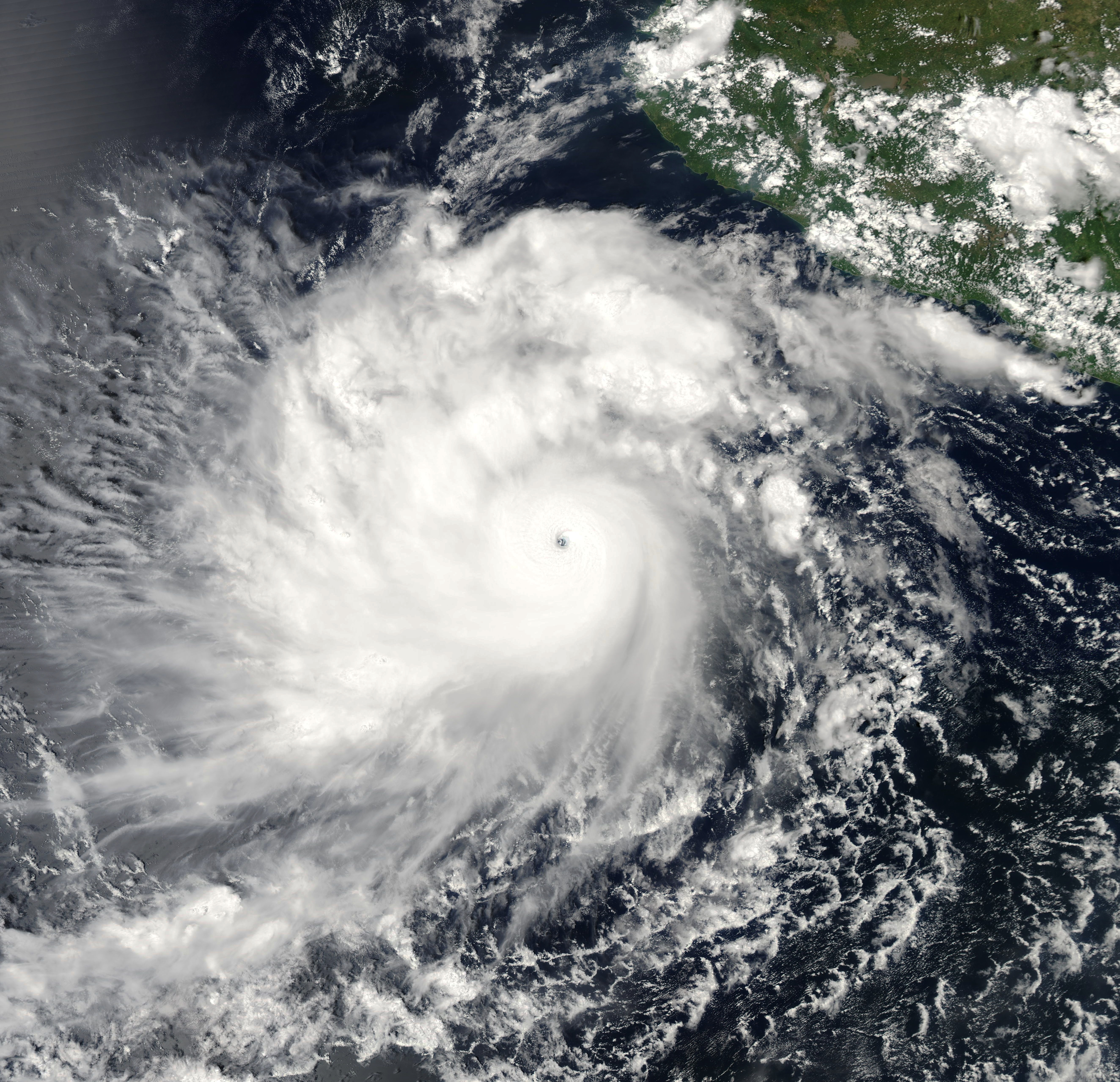
Satellite image of Hurricane Javier just before peak intensity late on September 13

- 06:00 UTC (11:00 p.m. PDT, September 12) at 14.1°N 104.8°W – Hurricane Javier strengthens to Category 2 intensity about 345 mi (555 km) south of Manzanillo, Colima.
- 12:00 UTC (5:00 a.m. PDT) at 14.7°N 105.4°W – Hurricane Javier strengthens to Category 3 intensity about 310 mi (500 km) south-southwest of Manzanillo, Colima, making it the third and final major hurricane of the season.
- 18:00 UTC (11:00 a.m. PDT) at 15.2°N 106.1°W – Hurricane Javier strengthens to Category 4 intensity about 295 mi (475 km) south-southwest of Manzanillo, Colima.

==== September 14 ====
- 00:00 UTC (5:00 p.m. PDT, September 13) at 15.9°N 106.8°W – Hurricane Javier attains peak winds of 150 mph (240 km/h) and a minimum barometric pressure of 930 mbar (27.46 inHg) about 270 mi (435 km) southwest of Manzanillo, Colima, making it the strongest storm of the season.

==== September 15 ====
- 12:00 UTC (5:00 a.m. PDT) at 17.8°N 131.8°W – Tropical Storm Isis strengthens into a Category 1 hurricane about 1,455 mi (2,345 km) west-southwest of Cabo San Lucas, Baja California Sur. It simultaneously attains peak winds of 75 mph (120 km/h) and a minimum barometric pressure of 987 mbar (29.15 inHg).
- 18:00 UTC (11:00 a.m. PDT) at 18.2°N 132.0°W – Hurricane Isis weakens into a tropical storm about 1,460 mi (2,355 km) west-southwest of Cabo San Lucas, Baja California Sur.

==== September 16 ====
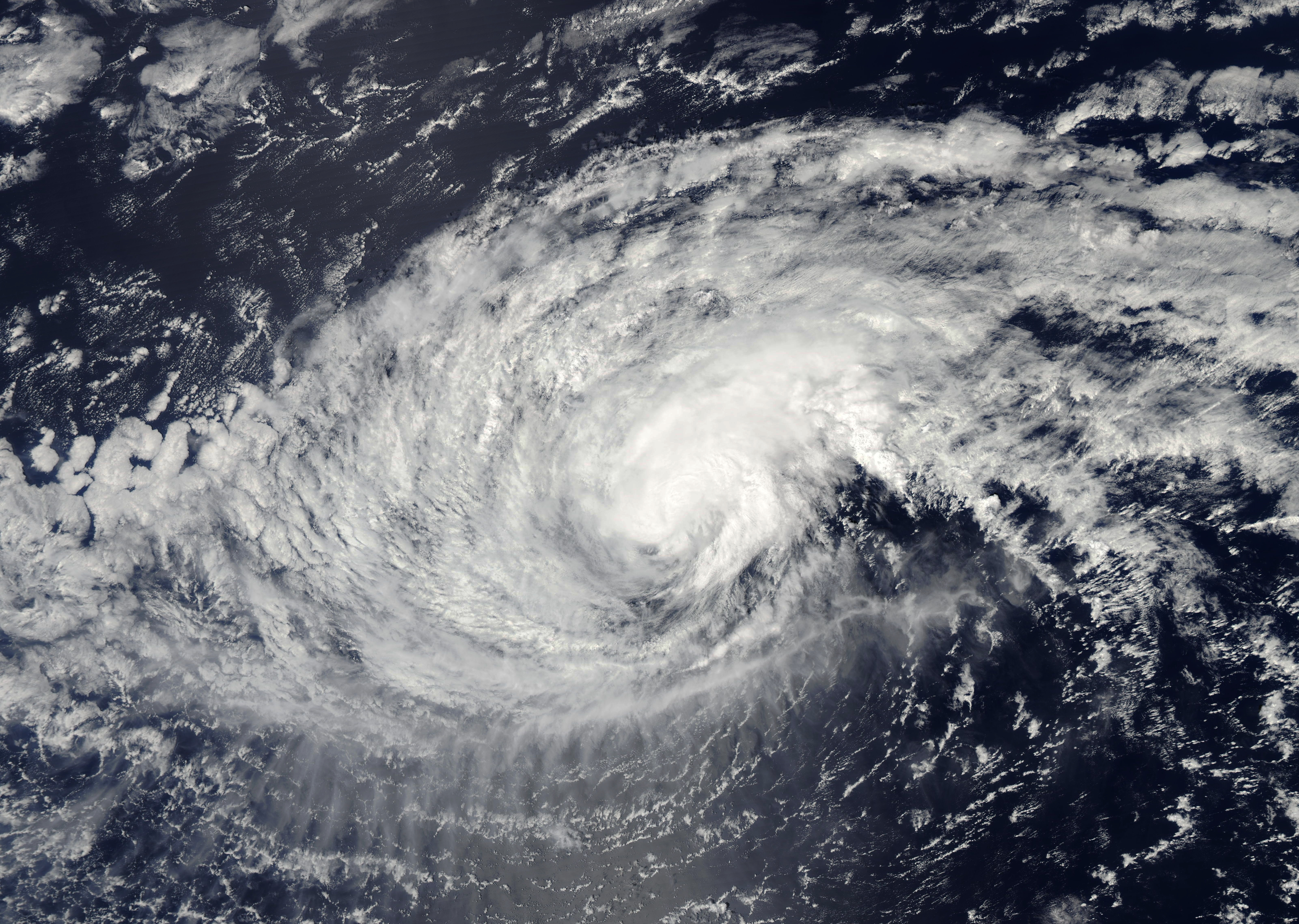
Satellite image of Tropical Storm Isis late on September 15, just after weakening below hurricane strength

- 00:00 UTC (5:00 p.m. PDT, September 15) at 18.9°N 109.5°W – Hurricane Javier weakens to Category 3 intensity about 340 mi (545 km) west of Manzanillo, Colima.
- 12:00 UTC (5:00 a.m. PDT) at 18.2°N 132.2°W – Tropical Storm Isis weakens into a tropical depression about 1,475 mi (2,370 km) west of Cabo San Lucas, Baja California Sur.
- 18:00 UTC (11:00 a.m. PDT) at 18.0°N 132.3°W – Tropical Depression Isis degenerates into a remnant low about 1,485 mi (2,390 km) west-southwest of Cabo San Lucas, Baja California Sur.

==== September 17 ====
- 12:00 UTC (5:00 a.m. PDT) at 21.5°N 111.9°W – Hurricane Javier weakens to Category 2 intensity about 230 mi (370 km) south of Cabo San Lázaro, Baja California Sur.

==== September 18 ====
- 00:00 UTC (5:00 p.m. PDT, September 17) at 22.4°N 112.4°W – Hurricane Javier weakens to Category 1 intensity about 165 mi (270 km) south of Cabo San Lázaro, Baja California Sur.
- 12:00 UTC (5:00 a.m. PDT) at 23.3°N 113.2°W – Hurricane Javier weakens into a tropical storm about 115 mi (185 km) south-southwest of Cabo San Lázaro, Baja California Sur.

==== September 19 ====
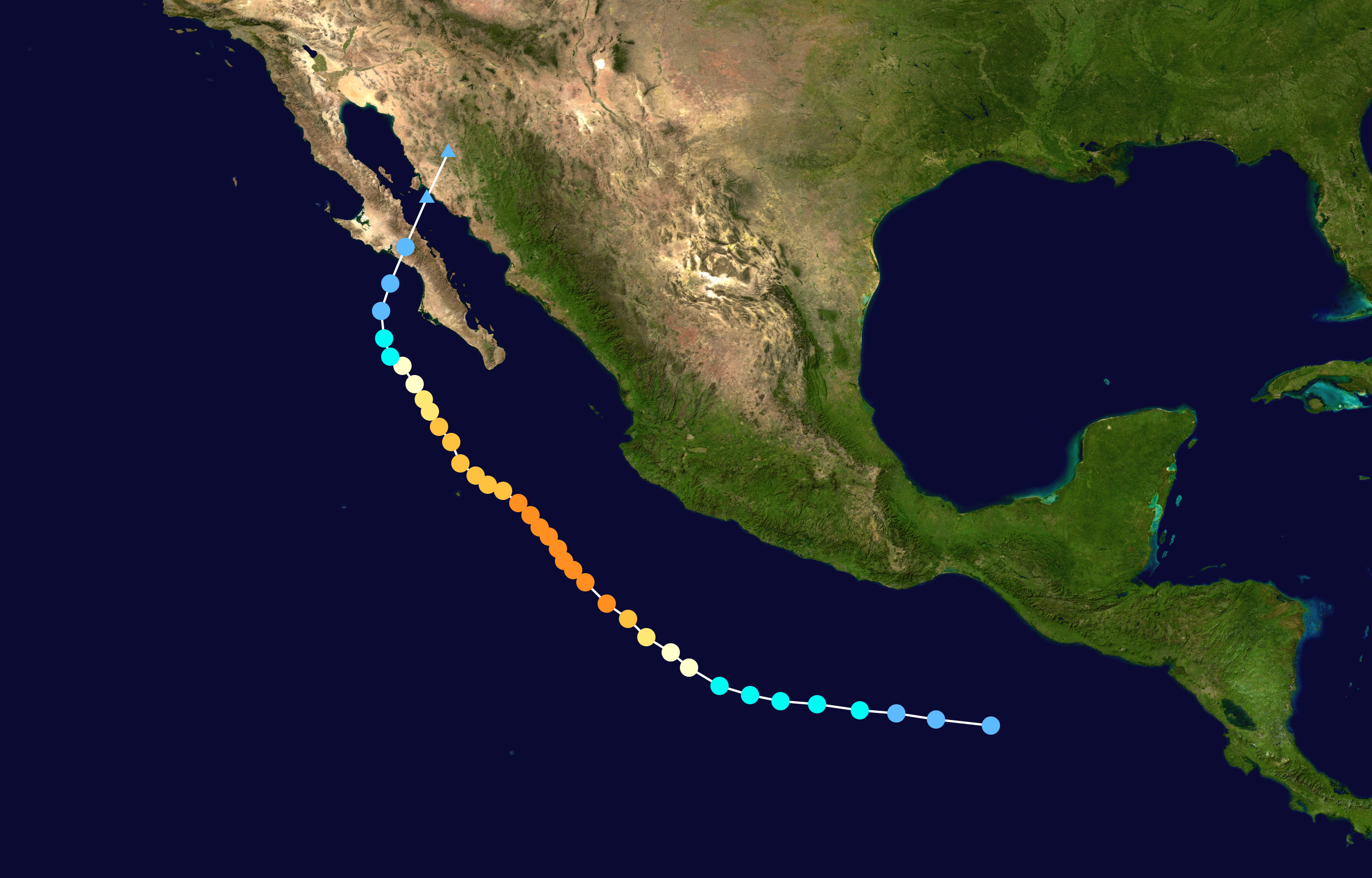
Track map of Hurricane Javier

- 00:00 UTC (5:00 p.m. PDT, September 18) at 24.8°N 113.5°W – Tropical Storm Javier weakens into a tropical depression about 75 mi (120 km) west of Cabo San Lázaro, Baja California Sur.
- 11:00 UTC (4:00 a.m. PDT) at 26.6°N 113.0°W – Tropical Depression Javier makes landfall on the west coast of Baja California Sur, about 35 mi (55 km) east-southeast of Punta Abreojos, with winds of 30 mph (45 km/h) and a barometric pressure of 1,003 mbar (29.62 inHg).
- 18:00 UTC (11:00 a.m. PDT) at 28.5°N 112.0°W – Tropical Depression Javier degenerates into a remnant low over the north-central Gulf of California, about 80 mi (130 km) west-northwest of Guaymas, Sonora.

=== October ===
==== October 4 ====
- 18:00 UTC (11:00 a.m. PDT) at 13.8°N 111.3°W – Tropical Depression Fourteen-E forms from an ITCZ disturbance about 585 mi (945 km) southwest of Manzanillo, Colima.

==== October 5 ====
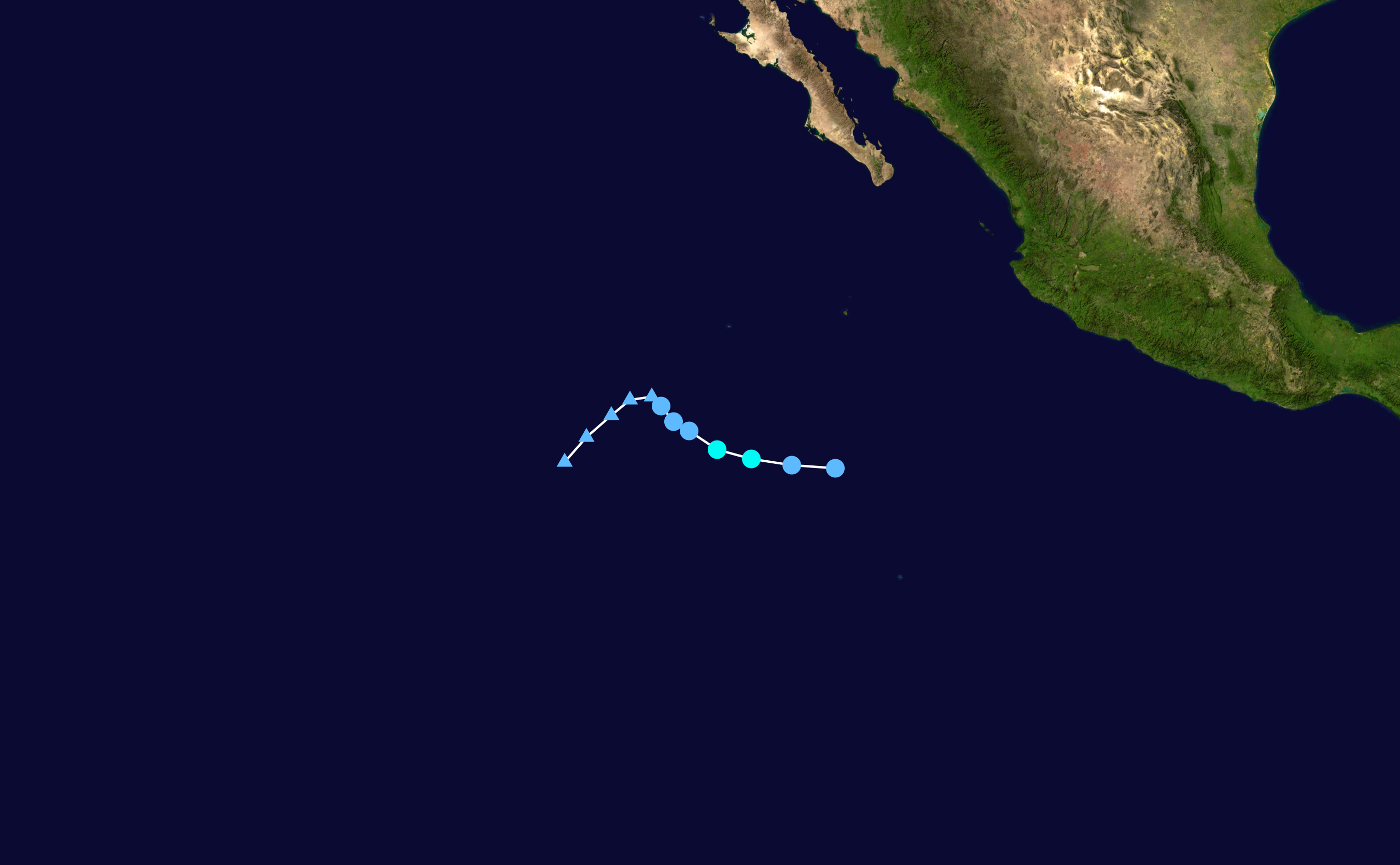
Track map of Tropical Storm Kay

- 06:00 UTC (11:00 p.m. PDT, October 4) at 14.1°N 114.0°W – Tropical Depression Fourteen-E strengthens into Tropical Storm Kay about 725 mi (1,165 km) west-southwest of Manzanillo, Colima.
- 12:00 UTC (5:00 a.m. PDT) at 14.4°N 115.1°W – Tropical Storm Kay attains peak winds of 45 mph (75 km/h) and a minimum barometric pressure of 1,004 mbar (29.65 inHg) about 785 mi (1,260 km) west-southwest of Manzanillo, Colima.
- 18:00 UTC (11:00 a.m. PDT) at 15.0°N 116.0°W – Tropical Storm Kay weakens into a tropical depression about 825 mi (1,325 km) west-southwest of Manzanillo, Colima.

==== October 6 ====
- 12:00 UTC (5:00 a.m. PDT) at 16.1°N 117.2°W – Tropical Depression Kay degenerates into a remnant low about 875 mi (1,410 km) west-southwest of Manzanillo, Colima.

==== October 11 ====
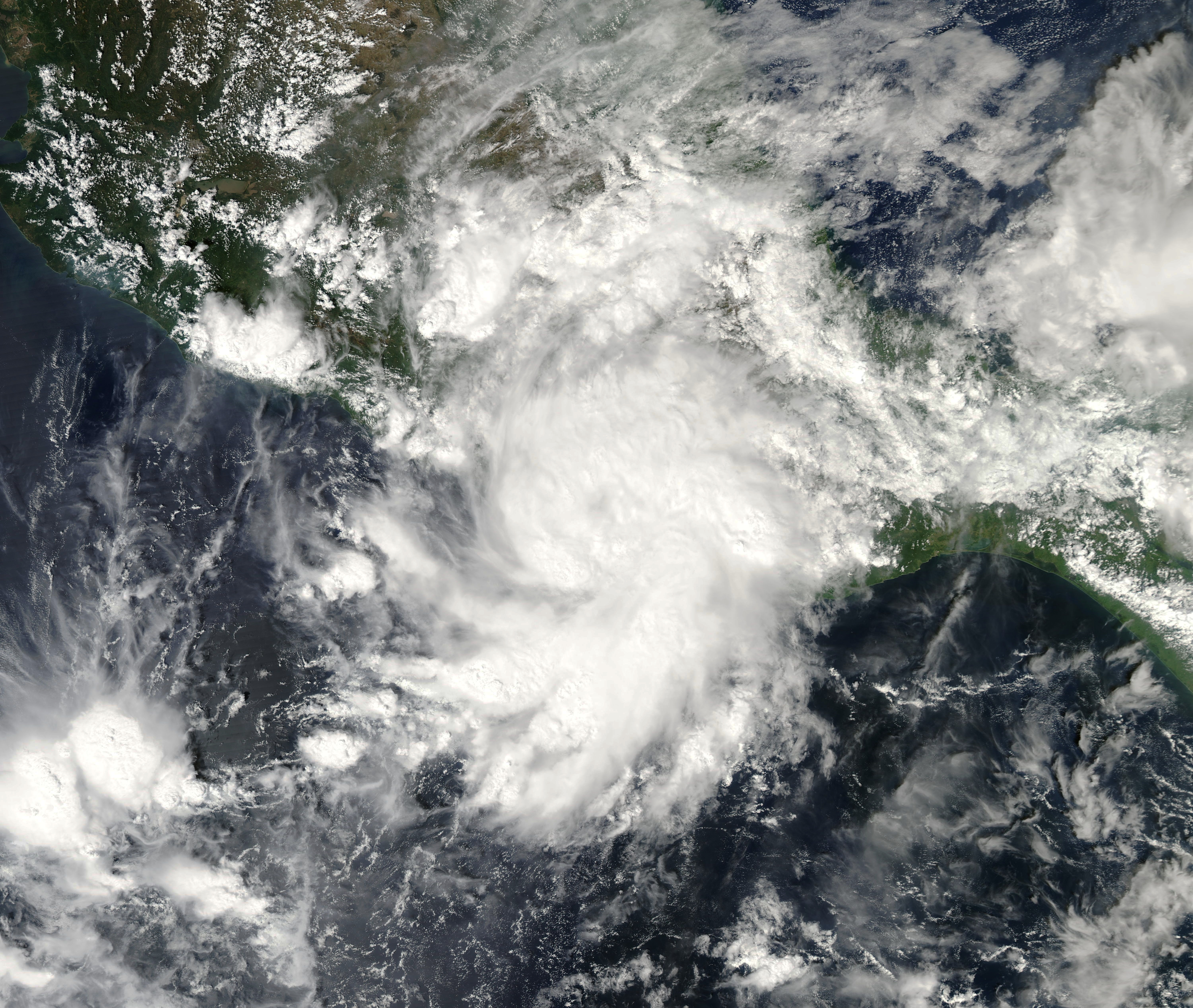
Satellite image of Tropical Storm Lester shortly after being upgraded late on October 12

- 18:00 UTC (11:00 a.m. PDT) at 14.4°N 96.7°W – A tropical depression forms from an area of unsettled weather about 105 mi (165 km) south-southeast of Puerto Escondido, Oaxaca.

==== October 12 ====
- 18:00 UTC (11:00 a.m. PDT) at 16.2°N 99.2°W – The aforementioned tropical depression strengthens into Tropical Storm Lester about 65 mi (100 km) southeast of Acapulco, Guerrero.

==== October 13 ====
- 00:00 UTC (5:00 p.m. PDT, October 12) at 16.4°N 99.6°W – Tropical Storm Lester attains peak winds of 50 mph (85 km/h) and a minimum barometric pressure of 1,000 mbar (29.53 inHg) about 35 mi (55 km) south-southeast of Acapulco, Guerrero.
- 12:00 UTC (5:00 a.m. PDT) at 16.7°N 100.6°W – Tropical Storm Lester weakens into a tropical depression about 45 mi (75 km) west-southwest of Acapulco, Guerrero; it dissipates six hours later.

==== October 25 ====
- 00:00 UTC (5:00 p.m. PDT, October 24) at 18.3°N 109.2°W – Tropical Depression Sixteen-E forms from a tropical wave about 320 mi (520 km) south of the southern tip of the Baja California peninsula.
- 06:00 UTC (11:00 p.m. PDT, October 24) at 19.3°N 109.1°W – Tropical Depression Sixteen-E attains peak winds of 35 mph (55 km/h) about 255 mi (410 km) south-southeast of the southern tip of the Baja California peninsula.

==== October 26 ====
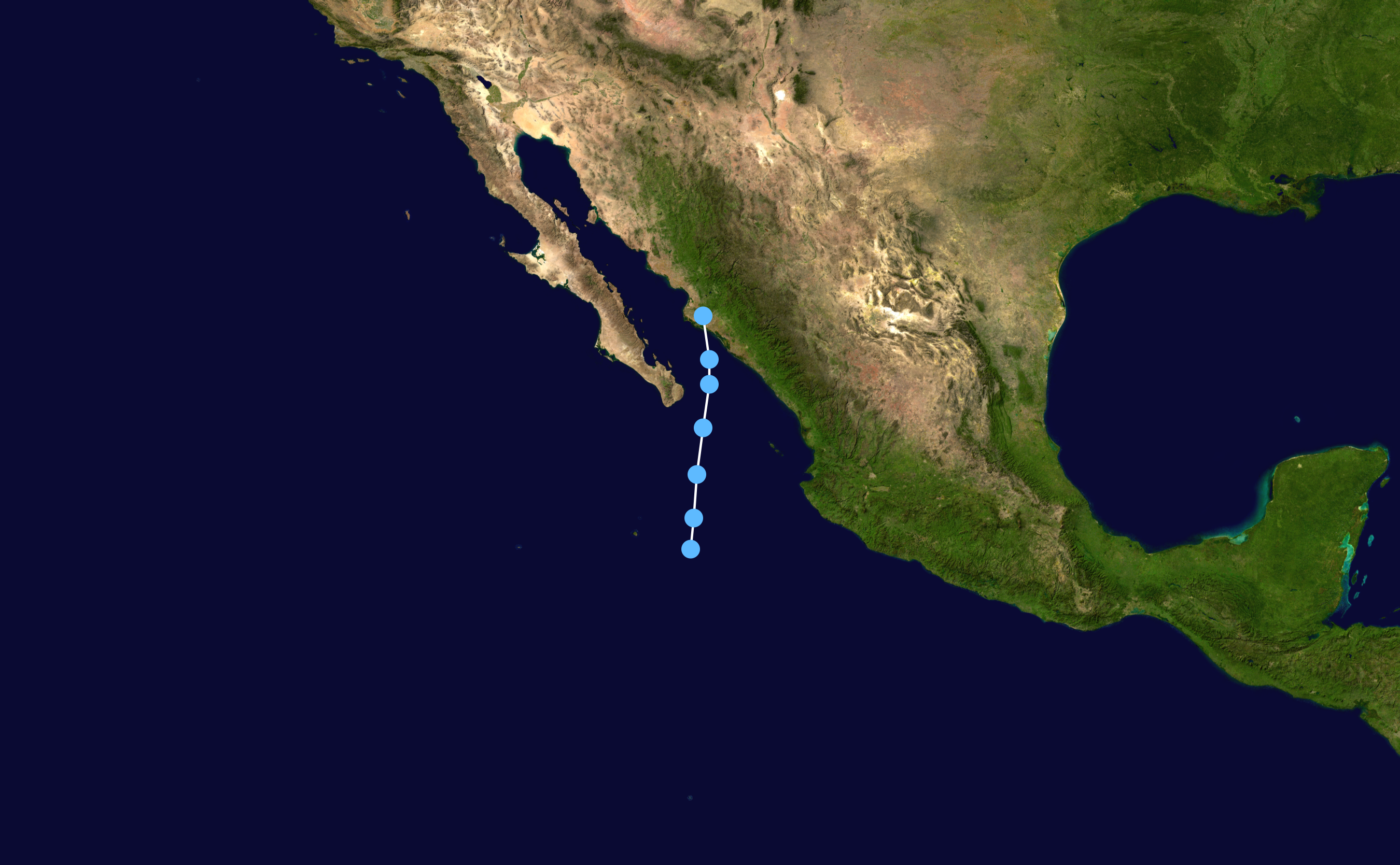
Track map of Tropical Depression Sixteen-E

- 00:00 UTC (5:00 p.m. PDT, October 25) at 23.6°N 108.6°W – Tropical Depression Sixteen-E attains a minimum barometric pressure of 1,004 mbar (29.65 inHg) about 100 mi (155 km) east-northeast of the southern tip of the Baja California peninsula.
- 10:00 UTC (3:00 a.m. PDT) at 25.4°N 108.8°W – Tropical Depression Sixteen-E makes landfall near Topolobampo and Guasave in the Mexican state of Sinaloa with winds of 35 mph (55 km/h) and a barometric pressure of 1,005 mbar (29.68 inHg).
- 18:00 UTC (11:00 a.m. PDT) at 25.8°N 108.8°W – Tropical Depression Sixteen-E is last noted inland about 25 mi (35 km) northeast of Topolobampo, or about 25 mi (35 km) northwest of Guasave; it dissipates six hours later over the Sierra Madre Occidental.

=== November ===
- No tropical cyclones were active in November.

==== November 30 ====
- The 2004 Pacific hurricane season officially ends.

== See also ==
- Timeline of the 2004 Atlantic hurricane season
- Timeline of the 2004 Pacific typhoon season
- Timeline of the 2004 North Indian Ocean cyclone season
- Timelines of the South-West Indian Ocean cyclone seasons: 2003–04, 2004–05
- Timelines of the Australian region cyclone seasons: 2003–04, 2004–05
- Timelines of the South Pacific cyclone seasons: 2003–04, 2004–05
