= Hurricane Javier (2004) =

Category 4 Eastern Pacific hurricane in 2004

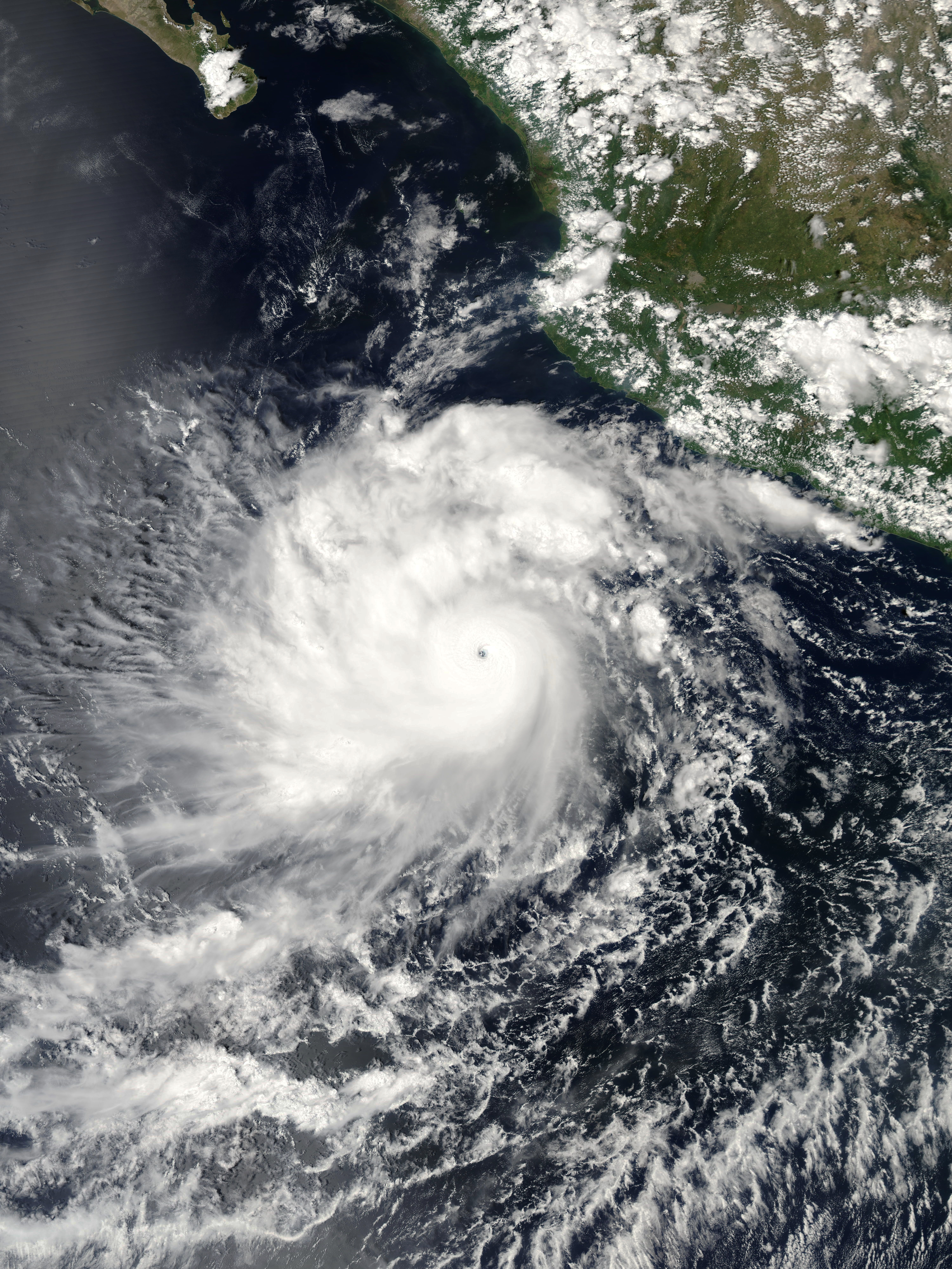
- Hurricane Javier near peak intensity on September 13

Meteorological history
- Formed: September 10, 2004
- Remnant low: September 19, 2004
- Dissipated: September 20, 2004

Category 4 major hurricane
- 1-minute sustained (SSHWS/NWS)
- Highest winds: 150 mph (240 km/h)
- Lowest pressure: 930 mbar (hPa); 27.46 inHg

Overall effects
- Missing: 3
- Areas affected: Baja California, Southwestern United States, Northern Plains, Minnesota, Colorado
- IBTrACS
- Part of the 2004 Pacific hurricane season

Hurricane Javier was a powerful tropical cyclone whose remnants brought above-average rainfall totals across the western United States in September 2004. Javier was the tenth named storm, the sixth hurricane and the final major hurricane of the 2004 Pacific hurricane season. Javier was also the strongest hurricane of the 2004 season, with 150 mph (240 km/h) winds and a central pressure of 930 millibars (27.46 Hg). However, because of high wind shear in the East Pacific, Javier weakened rapidly before making landfall in Baja California as a tropical depression. The remnants of the storm then continued moving northeast through the Southwestern United States. Javier caused no direct fatalities, and the damage in Mexico and the United States was minimal.

== Meteorological history ==
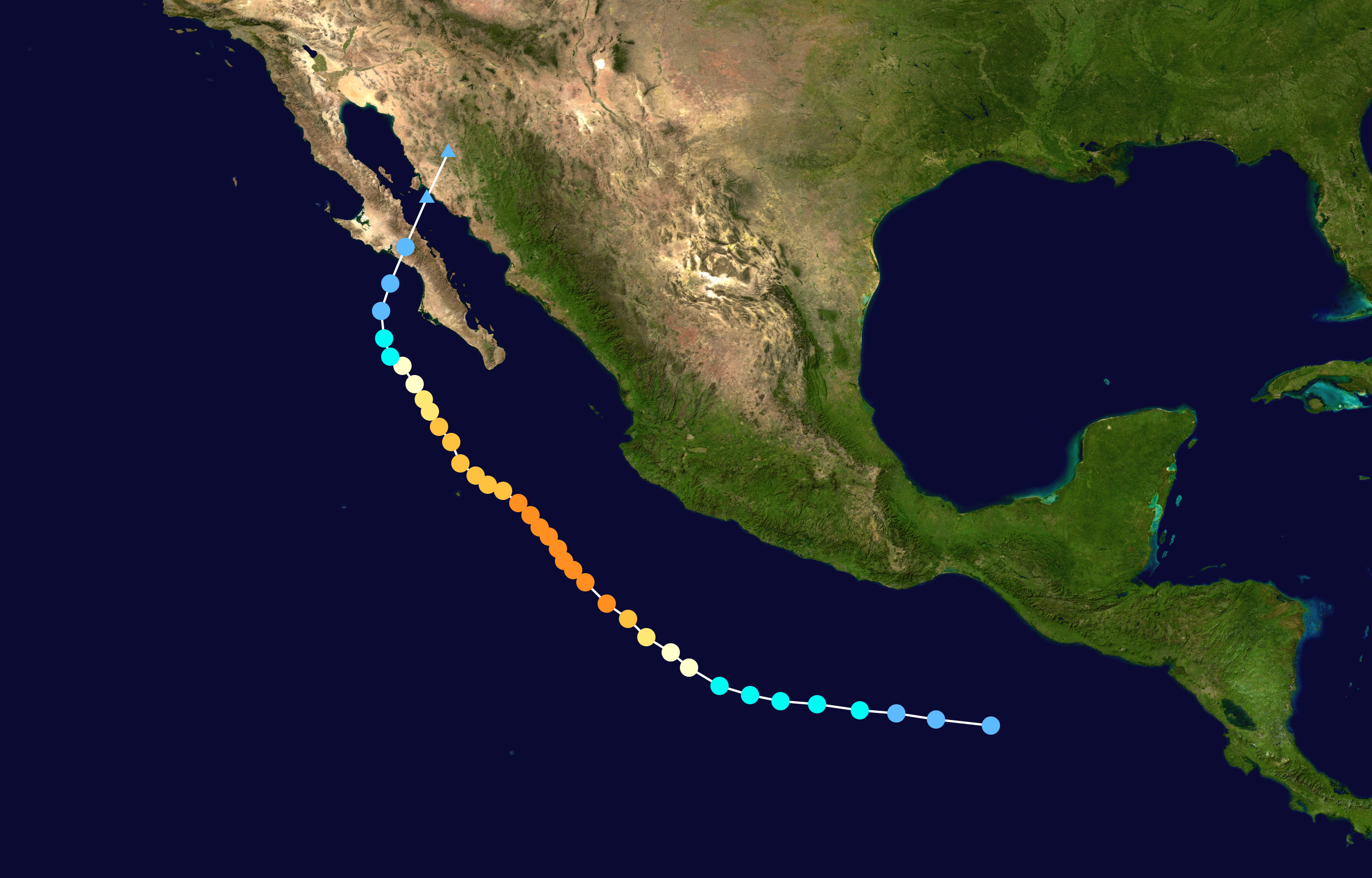
Map plotting the storm's track and intensity, according to the Saffir–Simpson scale Map key Saffir–Simpson scale Tropical depression (≤38 mph, ≤62 km/h) Tropical storm (39–73 mph, 63–118 km/h) Category 1 (74–95 mph, 119–153 km/h) Category 2 (96–110 mph, 154–177 km/h) Category 3 (111–129 mph, 178–208 km/h) Category 4 (130–156 mph, 209–251 km/h) Category 5 (≥157 mph, ≥252 km/h) Unknown Storm type Tropical cyclone Subtropical cyclone Extratropical cyclone, remnant low, tropical disturbance, or monsoon depression

On August 29, a tropical wave moved off the western coast of Africa. It tracked westward across the Atlantic basin, remaining devoid of deep convection—intense shower and thunderstorm activity—for several days. The disturbance interacted with a cold-core low in the vicinity of the Leeward Islands, and both features continued west across the Caribbean Sea. The wave crossed Central America on September 9 as convection steadily increased, and development of thunderstorm activity continued as it entered the East Pacific basin. Despite featuring limited outflow owing to modest easterly wind shear, the system acquired sufficient organization to be deemed a tropical depression around 18:00 UTC on September 10. The newly designated Tropical Depression Thirteen-E was located approximately 345 mi (555 km) south-southeast of Salina Cruz, Oaxaca, at this time.

Within a few hours of formation, the cyclone began to develop a small central dense overcast-like feature and some associated rainbands. This increase in organization suggested that it strengthened into Tropical Storm Javier around 12:00 UTC on September 11. Over the coming days, a subtropical ridge positioned over Mexico directed Javier on a west-northwest to northwest track offshore the coastline of Mexico. As the storm's convective appearance continued to mature, including the development of an eye and a rainband wrapping throughout the northwestern semicircle, it strengthened into a hurricane around 18:00 UTC on September 12. Javier continued to experience light northeasterly wind shear as it had since the system originally formed, resultant from an upper-level anticyclone focused over the Gulf of California. In spite of this shear, the cyclone soon began a period of rapid intensification as it developed a clear eye embedded within convection as cold as −112 °F (−80 °C). Javier attained major hurricane—Category 3 or greater on the Saffir–Simpson scale—intensity around 12:00 UTC on September 13, and within 12 hours it reached its peak intensity as a strong Category 4 hurricane. Satellite intensity estimates suggested the system attained winds of 150 mph (240 km/h) and a minimum barometric pressure of 930 mb (27 inHg), translating to a 65 mph (100 km/h) increase in winds and a 49 mb (1.4 inHg) drop in central pressure over the course of just 24 hours.

Early on September 14, Javier's small eye became cloud filled, and imagery of the system's internal structure suggested it was undergoing an eyewall replacement cycle. As this process underfolded but the hurricane otherwise remained within favorable conditions, Javier persisted as a Category 3–4 cyclone until early on September 17. By that time, the storm was entering cooler sea surface temperatures and strong southwesterly wind shear, and those inhibitors were exacerbated by plentiful mid- to upper-level dry air near the cyclone. The system began to lose its associated convective activity, which caused it to weaken under hurricane strength around 12:00 UTC on September 18. Javier was further reduced to a tropical depression within 12 hours. The weakening tropical depression moved onshore Baja California between Cabo San Lázaro and Punta Abreojos around 11:00 UTC on September 19. As it moved north and then north-northeast, it crossed into the Sea of Cortes. Having lacked thunderstorm activity for over 18 hours by that point, the fledging system degenerated to a remnant low around 18:00 UTC that day. The circulation moved into mainland Mexico near Guaymas and dissipated over the mountainous terrain of Sonora on September 20.

== Preparations and impact ==
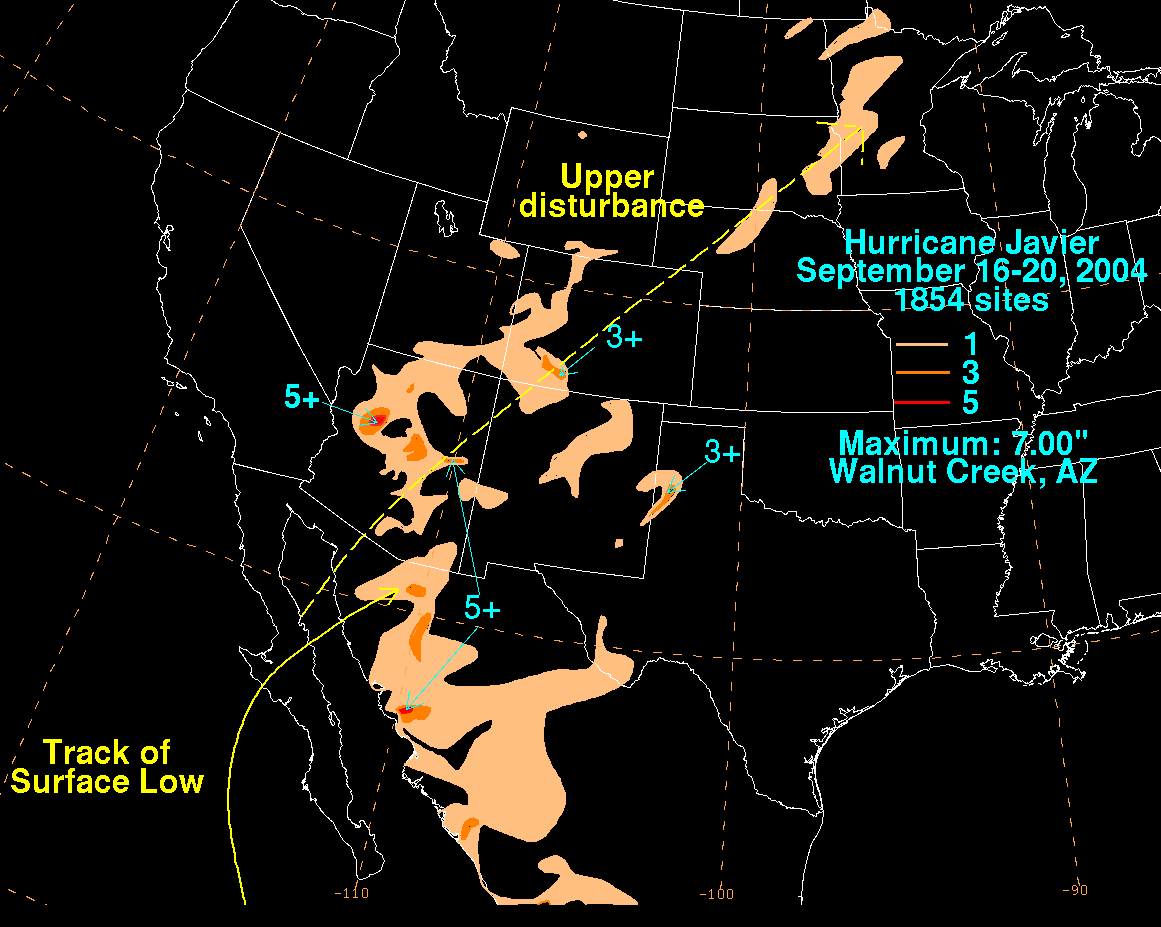
Rainfall totals from Hurricane Javier

The hurricane led to tropical storm warnings and watches for the Baja California peninsula. These included tropical storm warnings from Magdalena Bay to Punta Eugenia. The storm dropped 3.14 inches (80 mm) of rain in Bacanuchi, Mexico. Javier's flooding rains damaged portions of highway 1 near Vizcaino and three fishermen were reported missing when their ship was lost during the storm. In addition, oil prices began to climb when Javier passed through the area.

In Arizona, the remnants of Javier dropped widespread, light to moderate rainfall, improving topsoil moisture and greatly affecting a prolonged drought in the Southwestern United States. Maximum rainfall in the state reached 7 in (180 mm) in Walnut Creek. In Tucson, the airport received rainfall of 0.37 inches (93 mm) while the University of Arizona reported 0.89 inches (26 mm) of rain. Lightning and rain from Javier delayed the University of Arizona Wildcats football game against the Wisconsin Badgers for 88 minutes late in the second quarter, and flooding closed several roads. Grand Canyon, Arizona received 3.30 inches (84 mm) of rain, exactly one fifth of its yearly average. The remnants of Javier also dropped 1–3 inches of rain across Utah, Colorado, New Mexico, Texas and the upper Midwest. In terms of point maxima, Javier is the rainiest tropical cyclone on record in the period 1972–2008 in Wyoming and North Dakota.

== See also ==
- Other storms of the same name
- List of wettest tropical cyclones in Arizona
- Timeline of the 2004 Pacific hurricane season
- List of Category 4 Pacific hurricanes
