= List of storms named Darby =

The name Darby has been used for eight tropical cyclones in the Eastern Pacific Ocean.

- Tropical Storm Darby (1980) – did not affect land
- Tropical Storm Darby (1986) – remained at sea, remnants affected Arizona and California
- Hurricane Darby (1992) – Category 3 hurricane, remained well offshore but caused minor damage in Mexico and California
- Hurricane Darby (1998) – Category 3 hurricane, never affected land
- Hurricane Darby (2004) – Category 3 hurricane, remnants affected the Hawaiian Islands
- Hurricane Darby (2010) – Category 3 hurricane, dissipated off the coast of southern Mexico
- Hurricane Darby (2016) – Category 3 hurricane, made landfall on the island of Hawaii as a tropical storm
- Hurricane Darby (2022) – Category 4 hurricane, churned in the open ocean and dissipated south of the island of Hawaii.
